

302001–302100 

|-bgcolor=#d6d6d6
| 302001 ||  || — || August 31, 2000 || Socorro || LINEAR || — || align=right | 3.9 km || 
|-id=002 bgcolor=#fefefe
| 302002 ||  || — || August 26, 2000 || Socorro || LINEAR || — || align=right | 1.1 km || 
|-id=003 bgcolor=#d6d6d6
| 302003 ||  || — || August 25, 2000 || Socorro || LINEAR || — || align=right | 4.1 km || 
|-id=004 bgcolor=#fefefe
| 302004 ||  || — || August 31, 2000 || Socorro || LINEAR || — || align=right | 1.2 km || 
|-id=005 bgcolor=#fefefe
| 302005 ||  || — || September 1, 2000 || Socorro || LINEAR || PHO || align=right | 1.1 km || 
|-id=006 bgcolor=#fefefe
| 302006 ||  || — || September 1, 2000 || Socorro || LINEAR || — || align=right | 1.1 km || 
|-id=007 bgcolor=#d6d6d6
| 302007 ||  || — || September 1, 2000 || Socorro || LINEAR || EOS || align=right | 2.9 km || 
|-id=008 bgcolor=#d6d6d6
| 302008 ||  || — || September 2, 2000 || Anderson Mesa || LONEOS || — || align=right | 3.3 km || 
|-id=009 bgcolor=#d6d6d6
| 302009 ||  || — || September 5, 2000 || Anderson Mesa || LONEOS || — || align=right | 6.6 km || 
|-id=010 bgcolor=#FFC2E0
| 302010 ||  || — || September 21, 2000 || Socorro || LINEAR || APOcritical || align=right data-sort-value="0.65" | 650 m || 
|-id=011 bgcolor=#d6d6d6
| 302011 ||  || — || September 23, 2000 || Socorro || LINEAR || — || align=right | 3.6 km || 
|-id=012 bgcolor=#d6d6d6
| 302012 ||  || — || September 23, 2000 || Socorro || LINEAR || — || align=right | 2.9 km || 
|-id=013 bgcolor=#fefefe
| 302013 ||  || — || September 23, 2000 || Socorro || LINEAR || V || align=right | 1.1 km || 
|-id=014 bgcolor=#d6d6d6
| 302014 ||  || — || September 23, 2000 || Socorro || LINEAR || — || align=right | 3.9 km || 
|-id=015 bgcolor=#d6d6d6
| 302015 ||  || — || September 24, 2000 || Socorro || LINEAR || — || align=right | 3.8 km || 
|-id=016 bgcolor=#d6d6d6
| 302016 ||  || — || September 24, 2000 || Socorro || LINEAR || — || align=right | 3.2 km || 
|-id=017 bgcolor=#fefefe
| 302017 ||  || — || September 24, 2000 || Socorro || LINEAR || — || align=right | 1.1 km || 
|-id=018 bgcolor=#d6d6d6
| 302018 ||  || — || September 23, 2000 || Socorro || LINEAR || — || align=right | 4.0 km || 
|-id=019 bgcolor=#d6d6d6
| 302019 ||  || — || September 23, 2000 || Socorro || LINEAR || TIR || align=right | 3.1 km || 
|-id=020 bgcolor=#d6d6d6
| 302020 ||  || — || September 23, 2000 || Socorro || LINEAR || — || align=right | 3.4 km || 
|-id=021 bgcolor=#fefefe
| 302021 ||  || — || September 24, 2000 || Socorro || LINEAR || — || align=right data-sort-value="0.94" | 940 m || 
|-id=022 bgcolor=#fefefe
| 302022 ||  || — || September 22, 2000 || Socorro || LINEAR || — || align=right | 1.4 km || 
|-id=023 bgcolor=#d6d6d6
| 302023 ||  || — || September 23, 2000 || Socorro || LINEAR || — || align=right | 4.2 km || 
|-id=024 bgcolor=#FA8072
| 302024 ||  || — || September 23, 2000 || Socorro || LINEAR || — || align=right data-sort-value="0.98" | 980 m || 
|-id=025 bgcolor=#d6d6d6
| 302025 ||  || — || September 23, 2000 || Socorro || LINEAR || — || align=right | 4.4 km || 
|-id=026 bgcolor=#fefefe
| 302026 ||  || — || September 23, 2000 || Socorro || LINEAR || — || align=right | 1.3 km || 
|-id=027 bgcolor=#fefefe
| 302027 ||  || — || September 24, 2000 || Socorro || LINEAR || — || align=right | 1.0 km || 
|-id=028 bgcolor=#fefefe
| 302028 ||  || — || September 26, 2000 || Socorro || LINEAR || H || align=right data-sort-value="0.80" | 800 m || 
|-id=029 bgcolor=#fefefe
| 302029 ||  || — || September 19, 2000 || Haleakala || NEAT || ERI || align=right | 1.8 km || 
|-id=030 bgcolor=#d6d6d6
| 302030 ||  || — || September 24, 2000 || Socorro || LINEAR || — || align=right | 5.2 km || 
|-id=031 bgcolor=#fefefe
| 302031 ||  || — || September 26, 2000 || Socorro || LINEAR || MAS || align=right data-sort-value="0.79" | 790 m || 
|-id=032 bgcolor=#fefefe
| 302032 ||  || — || September 26, 2000 || Socorro || LINEAR || H || align=right data-sort-value="0.78" | 780 m || 
|-id=033 bgcolor=#fefefe
| 302033 ||  || — || September 30, 2000 || Socorro || LINEAR || — || align=right | 1.1 km || 
|-id=034 bgcolor=#fefefe
| 302034 ||  || — || September 23, 2000 || Socorro || LINEAR || V || align=right | 1.0 km || 
|-id=035 bgcolor=#d6d6d6
| 302035 ||  || — || September 24, 2000 || Socorro || LINEAR || EOS || align=right | 2.7 km || 
|-id=036 bgcolor=#d6d6d6
| 302036 ||  || — || September 26, 2000 || Socorro || LINEAR || — || align=right | 3.5 km || 
|-id=037 bgcolor=#d6d6d6
| 302037 ||  || — || September 27, 2000 || Socorro || LINEAR || — || align=right | 3.2 km || 
|-id=038 bgcolor=#d6d6d6
| 302038 ||  || — || September 27, 2000 || Socorro || LINEAR || — || align=right | 4.9 km || 
|-id=039 bgcolor=#fefefe
| 302039 ||  || — || September 27, 2000 || Socorro || LINEAR || — || align=right | 1.2 km || 
|-id=040 bgcolor=#d6d6d6
| 302040 ||  || — || September 28, 2000 || Socorro || LINEAR || EOS || align=right | 2.9 km || 
|-id=041 bgcolor=#d6d6d6
| 302041 ||  || — || September 30, 2000 || Socorro || LINEAR || TIR || align=right | 3.6 km || 
|-id=042 bgcolor=#d6d6d6
| 302042 ||  || — || September 28, 2000 || Socorro || LINEAR || — || align=right | 3.7 km || 
|-id=043 bgcolor=#d6d6d6
| 302043 ||  || — || September 26, 2000 || Haleakala || NEAT || — || align=right | 4.6 km || 
|-id=044 bgcolor=#fefefe
| 302044 ||  || — || September 24, 2000 || Socorro || LINEAR || NYS || align=right data-sort-value="0.70" | 700 m || 
|-id=045 bgcolor=#d6d6d6
| 302045 ||  || — || September 24, 2000 || Socorro || LINEAR || — || align=right | 4.0 km || 
|-id=046 bgcolor=#d6d6d6
| 302046 ||  || — || September 21, 2000 || Socorro || LINEAR || — || align=right | 3.9 km || 
|-id=047 bgcolor=#d6d6d6
| 302047 ||  || — || September 29, 2000 || Anderson Mesa || LONEOS || — || align=right | 3.5 km || 
|-id=048 bgcolor=#fefefe
| 302048 ||  || — || October 1, 2000 || Socorro || LINEAR || — || align=right | 1.0 km || 
|-id=049 bgcolor=#fefefe
| 302049 ||  || — || October 2, 2000 || Socorro || LINEAR || V || align=right data-sort-value="0.96" | 960 m || 
|-id=050 bgcolor=#d6d6d6
| 302050 ||  || — || October 2, 2000 || Socorro || LINEAR || EOS || align=right | 3.4 km || 
|-id=051 bgcolor=#d6d6d6
| 302051 ||  || — || October 3, 2000 || Socorro || LINEAR || EOS || align=right | 2.9 km || 
|-id=052 bgcolor=#fefefe
| 302052 ||  || — || October 1, 2000 || Socorro || LINEAR || FLO || align=right data-sort-value="0.77" | 770 m || 
|-id=053 bgcolor=#fefefe
| 302053 ||  || — || October 18, 2000 || Kitt Peak || Spacewatch || NYS || align=right data-sort-value="0.66" | 660 m || 
|-id=054 bgcolor=#d6d6d6
| 302054 ||  || — || October 22, 2000 || Kleť || Kleť Obs. || — || align=right | 4.4 km || 
|-id=055 bgcolor=#fefefe
| 302055 ||  || — || October 22, 2000 || Bergisch Gladbach || W. Bickel || ERI || align=right | 1.7 km || 
|-id=056 bgcolor=#fefefe
| 302056 ||  || — || October 27, 2000 || Kitt Peak || Spacewatch || — || align=right data-sort-value="0.77" | 770 m || 
|-id=057 bgcolor=#fefefe
| 302057 ||  || — || October 24, 2000 || Socorro || LINEAR || ERI || align=right | 2.2 km || 
|-id=058 bgcolor=#fefefe
| 302058 ||  || — || October 24, 2000 || Socorro || LINEAR || H || align=right | 2.2 km || 
|-id=059 bgcolor=#fefefe
| 302059 ||  || — || October 25, 2000 || Socorro || LINEAR || — || align=right | 1.1 km || 
|-id=060 bgcolor=#fefefe
| 302060 ||  || — || October 31, 2000 || Socorro || LINEAR || V || align=right | 1.1 km || 
|-id=061 bgcolor=#d6d6d6
| 302061 ||  || — || October 29, 2000 || Kitt Peak || Spacewatch || — || align=right | 4.7 km || 
|-id=062 bgcolor=#fefefe
| 302062 ||  || — || November 1, 2000 || Kitt Peak || Spacewatch || — || align=right data-sort-value="0.88" | 880 m || 
|-id=063 bgcolor=#fefefe
| 302063 ||  || — || November 1, 2000 || Socorro || LINEAR || MAS || align=right data-sort-value="0.71" | 710 m || 
|-id=064 bgcolor=#d6d6d6
| 302064 ||  || — || November 19, 2000 || Socorro || LINEAR || — || align=right | 5.3 km || 
|-id=065 bgcolor=#fefefe
| 302065 ||  || — || November 25, 2000 || Socorro || LINEAR || — || align=right data-sort-value="0.94" | 940 m || 
|-id=066 bgcolor=#fefefe
| 302066 ||  || — || November 20, 2000 || Socorro || LINEAR || — || align=right | 1.2 km || 
|-id=067 bgcolor=#d6d6d6
| 302067 ||  || — || November 21, 2000 || Socorro || LINEAR || TIR || align=right | 3.7 km || 
|-id=068 bgcolor=#fefefe
| 302068 ||  || — || November 28, 2000 || Kitt Peak || Spacewatch || NYS || align=right data-sort-value="0.79" | 790 m || 
|-id=069 bgcolor=#d6d6d6
| 302069 ||  || — || November 19, 2000 || Socorro || LINEAR || URS || align=right | 4.9 km || 
|-id=070 bgcolor=#d6d6d6
| 302070 ||  || — || November 20, 2000 || Socorro || LINEAR || ARM || align=right | 4.1 km || 
|-id=071 bgcolor=#d6d6d6
| 302071 ||  || — || November 20, 2000 || Socorro || LINEAR || — || align=right | 4.4 km || 
|-id=072 bgcolor=#fefefe
| 302072 ||  || — || November 20, 2000 || Socorro || LINEAR || NYS || align=right data-sort-value="0.85" | 850 m || 
|-id=073 bgcolor=#fefefe
| 302073 ||  || — || November 20, 2000 || Socorro || LINEAR || — || align=right | 1.1 km || 
|-id=074 bgcolor=#d6d6d6
| 302074 ||  || — || November 21, 2000 || Socorro || LINEAR || TIR || align=right | 5.2 km || 
|-id=075 bgcolor=#d6d6d6
| 302075 ||  || — || November 25, 2000 || Socorro || LINEAR || EUP || align=right | 3.8 km || 
|-id=076 bgcolor=#d6d6d6
| 302076 ||  || — || November 25, 2000 || Socorro || LINEAR || — || align=right | 5.1 km || 
|-id=077 bgcolor=#d6d6d6
| 302077 ||  || — || November 29, 2000 || Kitt Peak || Spacewatch || — || align=right | 3.6 km || 
|-id=078 bgcolor=#d6d6d6
| 302078 ||  || — || November 29, 2000 || Fountain Hills || C. W. Juels || Tj (2.94) || align=right | 6.9 km || 
|-id=079 bgcolor=#d6d6d6
| 302079 ||  || — || November 29, 2000 || Socorro || LINEAR || — || align=right | 5.4 km || 
|-id=080 bgcolor=#d6d6d6
| 302080 ||  || — || November 30, 2000 || Socorro || LINEAR || — || align=right | 7.0 km || 
|-id=081 bgcolor=#fefefe
| 302081 ||  || — || November 27, 2000 || Socorro || LINEAR || ERI || align=right | 1.8 km || 
|-id=082 bgcolor=#fefefe
| 302082 ||  || — || November 5, 2000 || Socorro || LINEAR || ERI || align=right | 1.9 km || 
|-id=083 bgcolor=#fefefe
| 302083 ||  || — || December 14, 2000 || Bohyunsan || Y.-B. Jeon, B.-C. Lee || V || align=right data-sort-value="0.65" | 650 m || 
|-id=084 bgcolor=#d6d6d6
| 302084 ||  || — || December 16, 2000 || Socorro || LINEAR || EUP || align=right | 7.6 km || 
|-id=085 bgcolor=#fefefe
| 302085 ||  || — || December 21, 2000 || Kitt Peak || Spacewatch || ERI || align=right | 2.1 km || 
|-id=086 bgcolor=#fefefe
| 302086 ||  || — || December 25, 2000 || Kitt Peak || Spacewatch || NYS || align=right data-sort-value="0.83" | 830 m || 
|-id=087 bgcolor=#fefefe
| 302087 ||  || — || December 31, 2000 || Kitt Peak || Spacewatch || NYS || align=right | 1.1 km || 
|-id=088 bgcolor=#d6d6d6
| 302088 ||  || — || December 28, 2000 || Socorro || LINEAR || — || align=right | 3.9 km || 
|-id=089 bgcolor=#fefefe
| 302089 ||  || — || December 30, 2000 || Socorro || LINEAR || — || align=right | 1.2 km || 
|-id=090 bgcolor=#fefefe
| 302090 ||  || — || December 30, 2000 || Socorro || LINEAR || — || align=right | 2.7 km || 
|-id=091 bgcolor=#d6d6d6
| 302091 ||  || — || December 28, 2000 || Socorro || LINEAR || EUP || align=right | 5.7 km || 
|-id=092 bgcolor=#d6d6d6
| 302092 ||  || — || January 4, 2001 || Haleakala || NEAT || HYG || align=right | 4.5 km || 
|-id=093 bgcolor=#E9E9E9
| 302093 ||  || — || January 18, 2001 || Kitt Peak || Spacewatch || — || align=right | 2.1 km || 
|-id=094 bgcolor=#fefefe
| 302094 ||  || — || February 2, 2001 || Anderson Mesa || LONEOS || — || align=right | 1.2 km || 
|-id=095 bgcolor=#E9E9E9
| 302095 ||  || — || February 17, 2001 || Socorro || LINEAR || — || align=right | 1.6 km || 
|-id=096 bgcolor=#E9E9E9
| 302096 ||  || — || February 19, 2001 || Socorro || LINEAR || — || align=right | 3.7 km || 
|-id=097 bgcolor=#E9E9E9
| 302097 ||  || — || March 2, 2001 || Haleakala || NEAT || — || align=right | 1.6 km || 
|-id=098 bgcolor=#FA8072
| 302098 ||  || — || March 21, 2001 || Socorro || LINEAR || Tj (2.9) || align=right | 3.4 km || 
|-id=099 bgcolor=#E9E9E9
| 302099 ||  || — || March 16, 2001 || Socorro || LINEAR || — || align=right | 2.5 km || 
|-id=100 bgcolor=#FA8072
| 302100 ||  || — || March 16, 2001 || Socorro || LINEAR || — || align=right | 2.4 km || 
|}

302101–302200 

|-bgcolor=#E9E9E9
| 302101 ||  || — || March 29, 2001 || Anderson Mesa || LONEOS || — || align=right | 1.2 km || 
|-id=102 bgcolor=#E9E9E9
| 302102 ||  || — || March 29, 2001 || Anderson Mesa || LONEOS || — || align=right | 1.8 km || 
|-id=103 bgcolor=#E9E9E9
| 302103 ||  || — || March 26, 2001 || Socorro || LINEAR || — || align=right | 1.4 km || 
|-id=104 bgcolor=#E9E9E9
| 302104 ||  || — || March 26, 2001 || Haleakala || NEAT || BRG || align=right | 1.6 km || 
|-id=105 bgcolor=#E9E9E9
| 302105 ||  || — || March 18, 2001 || Kitt Peak || Spacewatch || — || align=right | 1.3 km || 
|-id=106 bgcolor=#E9E9E9
| 302106 ||  || — || April 15, 2001 || Kitt Peak || Spacewatch || — || align=right | 1.2 km || 
|-id=107 bgcolor=#E9E9E9
| 302107 ||  || — || April 24, 2001 || Haleakala || NEAT || — || align=right | 3.8 km || 
|-id=108 bgcolor=#E9E9E9
| 302108 ||  || — || May 21, 2001 || Socorro || LINEAR || — || align=right | 2.7 km || 
|-id=109 bgcolor=#E9E9E9
| 302109 ||  || — || May 23, 2001 || Kitt Peak || Spacewatch || JUN || align=right | 1.4 km || 
|-id=110 bgcolor=#E9E9E9
| 302110 ||  || — || May 26, 2001 || Socorro || LINEAR || — || align=right | 2.7 km || 
|-id=111 bgcolor=#FA8072
| 302111 ||  || — || June 20, 2001 || Palomar || NEAT || — || align=right | 7.3 km || 
|-id=112 bgcolor=#E9E9E9
| 302112 ||  || — || June 25, 2001 || Shishikui || Shishikui || — || align=right | 4.3 km || 
|-id=113 bgcolor=#E9E9E9
| 302113 ||  || — || June 28, 2001 || Kitt Peak || Spacewatch || — || align=right | 2.3 km || 
|-id=114 bgcolor=#fefefe
| 302114 ||  || — || July 19, 2001 || Palomar || NEAT || — || align=right | 1.0 km || 
|-id=115 bgcolor=#fefefe
| 302115 ||  || — || July 20, 2001 || Palomar || NEAT || — || align=right | 1.1 km || 
|-id=116 bgcolor=#E9E9E9
| 302116 ||  || — || July 21, 2001 || Palomar || NEAT || DOR || align=right | 3.2 km || 
|-id=117 bgcolor=#d6d6d6
| 302117 ||  || — || August 11, 2001 || Palomar || NEAT || — || align=right | 2.8 km || 
|-id=118 bgcolor=#E9E9E9
| 302118 ||  || — || August 11, 2001 || Palomar || NEAT || GEF || align=right | 1.8 km || 
|-id=119 bgcolor=#FA8072
| 302119 ||  || — || August 12, 2001 || Haleakala || NEAT || — || align=right data-sort-value="0.76" | 760 m || 
|-id=120 bgcolor=#fefefe
| 302120 ||  || — || July 27, 2001 || Anderson Mesa || LONEOS || — || align=right data-sort-value="0.88" | 880 m || 
|-id=121 bgcolor=#fefefe
| 302121 ||  || — || August 16, 2001 || Socorro || LINEAR || — || align=right | 1.0 km || 
|-id=122 bgcolor=#E9E9E9
| 302122 ||  || — || August 25, 2001 || Socorro || LINEAR || — || align=right | 3.6 km || 
|-id=123 bgcolor=#E9E9E9
| 302123 ||  || — || August 20, 2001 || Socorro || LINEAR || — || align=right | 3.4 km || 
|-id=124 bgcolor=#E9E9E9
| 302124 ||  || — || August 23, 2001 || Anderson Mesa || LONEOS || HNA || align=right | 2.7 km || 
|-id=125 bgcolor=#E9E9E9
| 302125 ||  || — || August 21, 2001 || Socorro || LINEAR || — || align=right | 3.2 km || 
|-id=126 bgcolor=#d6d6d6
| 302126 ||  || — || August 26, 2001 || Kitt Peak || Spacewatch || — || align=right | 2.8 km || 
|-id=127 bgcolor=#d6d6d6
| 302127 ||  || — || August 28, 2001 || Bergisch Gladbac || W. Bickel || KAR || align=right | 1.4 km || 
|-id=128 bgcolor=#fefefe
| 302128 ||  || — || August 21, 2001 || Palomar || NEAT || H || align=right | 1.0 km || 
|-id=129 bgcolor=#FA8072
| 302129 ||  || — || August 22, 2001 || Socorro || LINEAR || — || align=right | 1.1 km || 
|-id=130 bgcolor=#fefefe
| 302130 ||  || — || August 22, 2001 || Socorro || LINEAR || — || align=right | 1.1 km || 
|-id=131 bgcolor=#E9E9E9
| 302131 ||  || — || August 23, 2001 || Anderson Mesa || LONEOS || — || align=right | 2.8 km || 
|-id=132 bgcolor=#FA8072
| 302132 ||  || — || August 24, 2001 || Socorro || LINEAR || — || align=right data-sort-value="0.57" | 570 m || 
|-id=133 bgcolor=#fefefe
| 302133 ||  || — || September 8, 2001 || Socorro || LINEAR || — || align=right | 1.1 km || 
|-id=134 bgcolor=#d6d6d6
| 302134 ||  || — || September 11, 2001 || Socorro || LINEAR || — || align=right | 2.9 km || 
|-id=135 bgcolor=#fefefe
| 302135 ||  || — || September 12, 2001 || Socorro || LINEAR || — || align=right | 1.0 km || 
|-id=136 bgcolor=#fefefe
| 302136 ||  || — || September 11, 2001 || Anderson Mesa || LONEOS || — || align=right data-sort-value="0.99" | 990 m || 
|-id=137 bgcolor=#fefefe
| 302137 ||  || — || September 11, 2001 || Anderson Mesa || LONEOS || — || align=right data-sort-value="0.91" | 910 m || 
|-id=138 bgcolor=#fefefe
| 302138 ||  || — || September 12, 2001 || Socorro || LINEAR || — || align=right data-sort-value="0.92" | 920 m || 
|-id=139 bgcolor=#fefefe
| 302139 ||  || — || September 12, 2001 || Socorro || LINEAR || FLO || align=right data-sort-value="0.74" | 740 m || 
|-id=140 bgcolor=#fefefe
| 302140 ||  || — || September 12, 2001 || Socorro || LINEAR || FLO || align=right data-sort-value="0.57" | 570 m || 
|-id=141 bgcolor=#FA8072
| 302141 ||  || — || September 18, 2001 || Kitt Peak || Spacewatch || — || align=right data-sort-value="0.72" | 720 m || 
|-id=142 bgcolor=#fefefe
| 302142 ||  || — || September 16, 2001 || Socorro || LINEAR || FLO || align=right data-sort-value="0.76" | 760 m || 
|-id=143 bgcolor=#fefefe
| 302143 ||  || — || September 20, 2001 || Socorro || LINEAR || FLO || align=right data-sort-value="0.65" | 650 m || 
|-id=144 bgcolor=#d6d6d6
| 302144 ||  || — || September 20, 2001 || Socorro || LINEAR || — || align=right | 3.1 km || 
|-id=145 bgcolor=#E9E9E9
| 302145 ||  || — || September 20, 2001 || Socorro || LINEAR || AGN || align=right | 1.6 km || 
|-id=146 bgcolor=#fefefe
| 302146 ||  || — || September 20, 2001 || Socorro || LINEAR || FLO || align=right data-sort-value="0.67" | 670 m || 
|-id=147 bgcolor=#fefefe
| 302147 ||  || — || September 20, 2001 || Desert Eagle || W. K. Y. Yeung || — || align=right data-sort-value="0.76" | 760 m || 
|-id=148 bgcolor=#d6d6d6
| 302148 ||  || — || September 16, 2001 || Socorro || LINEAR || CHA || align=right | 2.5 km || 
|-id=149 bgcolor=#d6d6d6
| 302149 ||  || — || September 17, 2001 || Socorro || LINEAR || CHA || align=right | 2.9 km || 
|-id=150 bgcolor=#fefefe
| 302150 ||  || — || September 19, 2001 || Socorro || LINEAR || — || align=right data-sort-value="0.68" | 680 m || 
|-id=151 bgcolor=#fefefe
| 302151 ||  || — || September 19, 2001 || Socorro || LINEAR || — || align=right data-sort-value="0.62" | 620 m || 
|-id=152 bgcolor=#d6d6d6
| 302152 ||  || — || September 19, 2001 || Socorro || LINEAR || — || align=right | 2.7 km || 
|-id=153 bgcolor=#d6d6d6
| 302153 ||  || — || September 19, 2001 || Socorro || LINEAR || KOR || align=right | 1.6 km || 
|-id=154 bgcolor=#fefefe
| 302154 ||  || — || September 19, 2001 || Socorro || LINEAR || — || align=right | 1.0 km || 
|-id=155 bgcolor=#fefefe
| 302155 ||  || — || September 19, 2001 || Socorro || LINEAR || — || align=right data-sort-value="0.74" | 740 m || 
|-id=156 bgcolor=#FFC2E0
| 302156 ||  || — || September 27, 2001 || Socorro || LINEAR || APO || align=right data-sort-value="0.56" | 560 m || 
|-id=157 bgcolor=#d6d6d6
| 302157 ||  || — || September 20, 2001 || Socorro || LINEAR || KOR || align=right | 1.4 km || 
|-id=158 bgcolor=#fefefe
| 302158 ||  || — || September 19, 2001 || Socorro || LINEAR || — || align=right data-sort-value="0.69" | 690 m || 
|-id=159 bgcolor=#fefefe
| 302159 ||  || — || September 21, 2001 || Socorro || LINEAR || — || align=right data-sort-value="0.80" | 800 m || 
|-id=160 bgcolor=#fefefe
| 302160 ||  || — || September 21, 2001 || Socorro || LINEAR || — || align=right data-sort-value="0.94" | 940 m || 
|-id=161 bgcolor=#fefefe
| 302161 ||  || — || September 25, 2001 || Socorro || LINEAR || FLO || align=right data-sort-value="0.68" | 680 m || 
|-id=162 bgcolor=#FA8072
| 302162 ||  || — || September 19, 2001 || Socorro || LINEAR || — || align=right data-sort-value="0.89" | 890 m || 
|-id=163 bgcolor=#d6d6d6
| 302163 ||  || — || September 25, 2001 || Socorro || LINEAR || BRA || align=right | 1.8 km || 
|-id=164 bgcolor=#fefefe
| 302164 ||  || — || September 25, 2001 || Socorro || LINEAR || — || align=right data-sort-value="0.77" | 770 m || 
|-id=165 bgcolor=#d6d6d6
| 302165 ||  || — || September 18, 2001 || Apache Point || SDSS || — || align=right | 4.0 km || 
|-id=166 bgcolor=#fefefe
| 302166 ||  || — || October 7, 2001 || Palomar || NEAT || — || align=right data-sort-value="0.72" | 720 m || 
|-id=167 bgcolor=#fefefe
| 302167 ||  || — || October 7, 2001 || Palomar || NEAT || FLO || align=right data-sort-value="0.76" | 760 m || 
|-id=168 bgcolor=#fefefe
| 302168 ||  || — || October 14, 2001 || Socorro || LINEAR || FLO || align=right data-sort-value="0.73" | 730 m || 
|-id=169 bgcolor=#FFC2E0
| 302169 ||  || — || October 15, 2001 || Socorro || LINEAR || ATEPHA || align=right data-sort-value="0.39" | 390 m || 
|-id=170 bgcolor=#fefefe
| 302170 ||  || — || October 15, 2001 || Socorro || LINEAR || H || align=right data-sort-value="0.82" | 820 m || 
|-id=171 bgcolor=#fefefe
| 302171 ||  || — || October 13, 2001 || Socorro || LINEAR || — || align=right data-sort-value="0.93" | 930 m || 
|-id=172 bgcolor=#fefefe
| 302172 ||  || — || October 10, 2001 || Palomar || NEAT || FLO || align=right data-sort-value="0.94" | 940 m || 
|-id=173 bgcolor=#fefefe
| 302173 ||  || — || October 13, 2001 || Socorro || LINEAR || — || align=right data-sort-value="0.80" | 800 m || 
|-id=174 bgcolor=#d6d6d6
| 302174 ||  || — || October 13, 2001 || Socorro || LINEAR || — || align=right | 4.1 km || 
|-id=175 bgcolor=#d6d6d6
| 302175 ||  || — || October 14, 2001 || Socorro || LINEAR || — || align=right | 2.1 km || 
|-id=176 bgcolor=#fefefe
| 302176 ||  || — || October 14, 2001 || Socorro || LINEAR || — || align=right | 1.3 km || 
|-id=177 bgcolor=#fefefe
| 302177 ||  || — || October 14, 2001 || Socorro || LINEAR || — || align=right data-sort-value="0.76" | 760 m || 
|-id=178 bgcolor=#d6d6d6
| 302178 ||  || — || October 14, 2001 || Socorro || LINEAR || LAU || align=right | 2.1 km || 
|-id=179 bgcolor=#fefefe
| 302179 ||  || — || October 15, 2001 || Socorro || LINEAR || — || align=right data-sort-value="0.99" | 990 m || 
|-id=180 bgcolor=#fefefe
| 302180 ||  || — || October 10, 2001 || Palomar || NEAT || FLO || align=right data-sort-value="0.77" | 770 m || 
|-id=181 bgcolor=#fefefe
| 302181 ||  || — || October 15, 2001 || Kitt Peak || Spacewatch || FLO || align=right data-sort-value="0.83" | 830 m || 
|-id=182 bgcolor=#fefefe
| 302182 ||  || — || October 11, 2001 || Palomar || NEAT || — || align=right data-sort-value="0.72" | 720 m || 
|-id=183 bgcolor=#d6d6d6
| 302183 ||  || — || October 11, 2001 || Palomar || NEAT || — || align=right | 3.6 km || 
|-id=184 bgcolor=#fefefe
| 302184 ||  || — || October 13, 2001 || Socorro || LINEAR || — || align=right data-sort-value="0.97" | 970 m || 
|-id=185 bgcolor=#d6d6d6
| 302185 ||  || — || October 14, 2001 || Socorro || LINEAR || BRA || align=right | 1.9 km || 
|-id=186 bgcolor=#fefefe
| 302186 ||  || — || October 14, 2001 || Socorro || LINEAR || — || align=right data-sort-value="0.91" | 910 m || 
|-id=187 bgcolor=#d6d6d6
| 302187 ||  || — || October 15, 2001 || Kitt Peak || Spacewatch || — || align=right | 2.2 km || 
|-id=188 bgcolor=#d6d6d6
| 302188 ||  || — || October 14, 2001 || Apache Point || SDSS || — || align=right | 2.1 km || 
|-id=189 bgcolor=#d6d6d6
| 302189 ||  || — || October 14, 2001 || Apache Point || SDSS || CHA || align=right | 1.8 km || 
|-id=190 bgcolor=#fefefe
| 302190 ||  || — || October 14, 2001 || Apache Point || SDSS || — || align=right data-sort-value="0.60" | 600 m || 
|-id=191 bgcolor=#d6d6d6
| 302191 ||  || — || October 14, 2001 || Apache Point || SDSS || — || align=right | 3.2 km || 
|-id=192 bgcolor=#d6d6d6
| 302192 ||  || — || October 14, 2001 || Apache Point || SDSS || — || align=right | 2.5 km || 
|-id=193 bgcolor=#FA8072
| 302193 ||  || — || October 16, 2001 || Palomar || NEAT || — || align=right data-sort-value="0.85" | 850 m || 
|-id=194 bgcolor=#fefefe
| 302194 ||  || — || October 18, 2001 || Kitt Peak || Spacewatch || FLO || align=right | 1.0 km || 
|-id=195 bgcolor=#fefefe
| 302195 ||  || — || October 17, 2001 || Socorro || LINEAR || — || align=right data-sort-value="0.98" | 980 m || 
|-id=196 bgcolor=#d6d6d6
| 302196 ||  || — || October 17, 2001 || Socorro || LINEAR || — || align=right | 3.2 km || 
|-id=197 bgcolor=#fefefe
| 302197 ||  || — || October 18, 2001 || Socorro || LINEAR || — || align=right data-sort-value="0.84" | 840 m || 
|-id=198 bgcolor=#d6d6d6
| 302198 ||  || — || October 18, 2001 || Socorro || LINEAR || BRA || align=right | 2.3 km || 
|-id=199 bgcolor=#fefefe
| 302199 ||  || — || October 17, 2001 || Socorro || LINEAR || FLO || align=right data-sort-value="0.80" | 800 m || 
|-id=200 bgcolor=#fefefe
| 302200 ||  || — || October 20, 2001 || Socorro || LINEAR || — || align=right data-sort-value="0.93" | 930 m || 
|}

302201–302300 

|-bgcolor=#d6d6d6
| 302201 ||  || — || October 18, 2001 || Kitt Peak || Spacewatch || — || align=right | 3.1 km || 
|-id=202 bgcolor=#fefefe
| 302202 ||  || — || October 20, 2001 || Socorro || LINEAR || — || align=right data-sort-value="0.70" | 700 m || 
|-id=203 bgcolor=#fefefe
| 302203 ||  || — || October 21, 2001 || Socorro || LINEAR || FLO || align=right data-sort-value="0.68" | 680 m || 
|-id=204 bgcolor=#fefefe
| 302204 ||  || — || October 22, 2001 || Socorro || LINEAR || — || align=right data-sort-value="0.97" | 970 m || 
|-id=205 bgcolor=#fefefe
| 302205 ||  || — || October 21, 2001 || Socorro || LINEAR || — || align=right data-sort-value="0.87" | 870 m || 
|-id=206 bgcolor=#fefefe
| 302206 ||  || — || October 23, 2001 || Socorro || LINEAR || — || align=right data-sort-value="0.74" | 740 m || 
|-id=207 bgcolor=#fefefe
| 302207 ||  || — || October 23, 2001 || Socorro || LINEAR || — || align=right data-sort-value="0.76" | 760 m || 
|-id=208 bgcolor=#d6d6d6
| 302208 ||  || — || October 23, 2001 || Socorro || LINEAR || — || align=right | 2.5 km || 
|-id=209 bgcolor=#d6d6d6
| 302209 ||  || — || October 23, 2001 || Socorro || LINEAR || EOS || align=right | 2.1 km || 
|-id=210 bgcolor=#d6d6d6
| 302210 ||  || — || October 23, 2001 || Socorro || LINEAR || — || align=right | 3.3 km || 
|-id=211 bgcolor=#fefefe
| 302211 ||  || — || October 23, 2001 || Socorro || LINEAR || — || align=right | 1.3 km || 
|-id=212 bgcolor=#d6d6d6
| 302212 ||  || — || October 21, 2001 || Socorro || LINEAR || — || align=right | 3.9 km || 
|-id=213 bgcolor=#fefefe
| 302213 ||  || — || October 18, 2001 || Palomar || NEAT || — || align=right | 1.0 km || 
|-id=214 bgcolor=#fefefe
| 302214 ||  || — || October 25, 2001 || Kitt Peak || Spacewatch || — || align=right data-sort-value="0.70" | 700 m || 
|-id=215 bgcolor=#d6d6d6
| 302215 ||  || — || October 18, 2001 || Kitt Peak || Spacewatch || — || align=right | 2.8 km || 
|-id=216 bgcolor=#d6d6d6
| 302216 ||  || — || October 19, 2001 || Palomar || NEAT || — || align=right | 2.1 km || 
|-id=217 bgcolor=#fefefe
| 302217 ||  || — || October 20, 2001 || Socorro || LINEAR || — || align=right data-sort-value="0.96" | 960 m || 
|-id=218 bgcolor=#d6d6d6
| 302218 ||  || — || October 24, 2001 || Kitt Peak || Spacewatch || KOR || align=right | 1.7 km || 
|-id=219 bgcolor=#d6d6d6
| 302219 ||  || — || October 16, 2001 || Kitt Peak || Spacewatch || — || align=right | 4.1 km || 
|-id=220 bgcolor=#d6d6d6
| 302220 ||  || — || October 16, 2001 || Palomar || NEAT || — || align=right | 2.9 km || 
|-id=221 bgcolor=#d6d6d6
| 302221 ||  || — || November 10, 2001 || Socorro || LINEAR || AEG || align=right | 4.0 km || 
|-id=222 bgcolor=#fefefe
| 302222 ||  || — || November 9, 2001 || Socorro || LINEAR || — || align=right | 1.3 km || 
|-id=223 bgcolor=#fefefe
| 302223 ||  || — || November 9, 2001 || Socorro || LINEAR || — || align=right | 1.1 km || 
|-id=224 bgcolor=#fefefe
| 302224 ||  || — || November 10, 2001 || Socorro || LINEAR || — || align=right | 1.1 km || 
|-id=225 bgcolor=#fefefe
| 302225 ||  || — || November 10, 2001 || Socorro || LINEAR || PHO || align=right | 2.4 km || 
|-id=226 bgcolor=#fefefe
| 302226 ||  || — || November 12, 2001 || Socorro || LINEAR || — || align=right data-sort-value="0.98" | 980 m || 
|-id=227 bgcolor=#d6d6d6
| 302227 ||  || — || November 15, 2001 || Socorro || LINEAR || — || align=right | 3.6 km || 
|-id=228 bgcolor=#FA8072
| 302228 ||  || — || November 12, 2001 || Socorro || LINEAR || — || align=right data-sort-value="0.81" | 810 m || 
|-id=229 bgcolor=#d6d6d6
| 302229 ||  || — || November 12, 2001 || Socorro || LINEAR || — || align=right | 4.6 km || 
|-id=230 bgcolor=#d6d6d6
| 302230 ||  || — || November 11, 2001 || Apache Point || SDSS || — || align=right | 2.6 km || 
|-id=231 bgcolor=#fefefe
| 302231 ||  || — || November 20, 2001 || Socorro || LINEAR || H || align=right data-sort-value="0.67" | 670 m || 
|-id=232 bgcolor=#fefefe
| 302232 ||  || — || November 21, 2001 || Socorro || LINEAR || PHO || align=right | 1.9 km || 
|-id=233 bgcolor=#fefefe
| 302233 ||  || — || November 17, 2001 || Socorro || LINEAR || — || align=right data-sort-value="0.92" | 920 m || 
|-id=234 bgcolor=#d6d6d6
| 302234 ||  || — || November 17, 2001 || Kitt Peak || Spacewatch || KOR || align=right | 1.8 km || 
|-id=235 bgcolor=#fefefe
| 302235 ||  || — || November 17, 2001 || Socorro || LINEAR || — || align=right | 1.0 km || 
|-id=236 bgcolor=#d6d6d6
| 302236 ||  || — || November 17, 2001 || Socorro || LINEAR || — || align=right | 3.6 km || 
|-id=237 bgcolor=#fefefe
| 302237 ||  || — || November 17, 2001 || Socorro || LINEAR || FLO || align=right data-sort-value="0.85" | 850 m || 
|-id=238 bgcolor=#d6d6d6
| 302238 ||  || — || November 18, 2001 || Socorro || LINEAR || EOS || align=right | 1.9 km || 
|-id=239 bgcolor=#d6d6d6
| 302239 ||  || — || November 19, 2001 || Socorro || LINEAR || — || align=right | 2.7 km || 
|-id=240 bgcolor=#fefefe
| 302240 ||  || — || November 19, 2001 || Socorro || LINEAR || — || align=right data-sort-value="0.97" | 970 m || 
|-id=241 bgcolor=#fefefe
| 302241 ||  || — || November 20, 2001 || Socorro || LINEAR || — || align=right data-sort-value="0.87" | 870 m || 
|-id=242 bgcolor=#fefefe
| 302242 ||  || — || November 19, 2001 || Anderson Mesa || LONEOS || FLO || align=right data-sort-value="0.75" | 750 m || 
|-id=243 bgcolor=#fefefe
| 302243 ||  || — || November 16, 2001 || Kitt Peak || Spacewatch || — || align=right data-sort-value="0.90" | 900 m || 
|-id=244 bgcolor=#fefefe
| 302244 ||  || — || November 16, 2001 || Kitt Peak || Spacewatch || — || align=right data-sort-value="0.80" | 800 m || 
|-id=245 bgcolor=#d6d6d6
| 302245 ||  || — || November 21, 2001 || Apache Point || SDSS || — || align=right | 2.6 km || 
|-id=246 bgcolor=#fefefe
| 302246 ||  || — || December 9, 2001 || Socorro || LINEAR || H || align=right data-sort-value="0.92" | 920 m || 
|-id=247 bgcolor=#fefefe
| 302247 ||  || — || December 9, 2001 || Socorro || LINEAR || H || align=right data-sort-value="0.96" | 960 m || 
|-id=248 bgcolor=#fefefe
| 302248 ||  || — || December 10, 2001 || Kitt Peak || Spacewatch || — || align=right data-sort-value="0.91" | 910 m || 
|-id=249 bgcolor=#d6d6d6
| 302249 ||  || — || December 10, 2001 || Kitt Peak || Spacewatch || — || align=right | 2.8 km || 
|-id=250 bgcolor=#fefefe
| 302250 ||  || — || December 10, 2001 || Kitt Peak || Spacewatch || H || align=right data-sort-value="0.98" | 980 m || 
|-id=251 bgcolor=#fefefe
| 302251 ||  || — || December 10, 2001 || Socorro || LINEAR || — || align=right data-sort-value="0.96" | 960 m || 
|-id=252 bgcolor=#d6d6d6
| 302252 ||  || — || December 11, 2001 || Socorro || LINEAR || — || align=right | 3.7 km || 
|-id=253 bgcolor=#d6d6d6
| 302253 ||  || — || December 11, 2001 || Socorro || LINEAR || CHA || align=right | 3.1 km || 
|-id=254 bgcolor=#fefefe
| 302254 ||  || — || December 11, 2001 || Socorro || LINEAR || PHO || align=right | 1.4 km || 
|-id=255 bgcolor=#d6d6d6
| 302255 ||  || — || December 10, 2001 || Socorro || LINEAR || — || align=right | 3.2 km || 
|-id=256 bgcolor=#fefefe
| 302256 ||  || — || December 10, 2001 || Socorro || LINEAR || — || align=right | 1.1 km || 
|-id=257 bgcolor=#fefefe
| 302257 ||  || — || December 14, 2001 || Socorro || LINEAR || H || align=right data-sort-value="0.89" | 890 m || 
|-id=258 bgcolor=#fefefe
| 302258 ||  || — || December 10, 2001 || Socorro || LINEAR || — || align=right | 1.4 km || 
|-id=259 bgcolor=#d6d6d6
| 302259 ||  || — || December 11, 2001 || Socorro || LINEAR || EUP || align=right | 5.0 km || 
|-id=260 bgcolor=#d6d6d6
| 302260 ||  || — || December 14, 2001 || Socorro || LINEAR || EOS || align=right | 2.5 km || 
|-id=261 bgcolor=#fefefe
| 302261 ||  || — || December 14, 2001 || Socorro || LINEAR || — || align=right data-sort-value="0.95" | 950 m || 
|-id=262 bgcolor=#d6d6d6
| 302262 ||  || — || December 14, 2001 || Socorro || LINEAR || — || align=right | 3.8 km || 
|-id=263 bgcolor=#fefefe
| 302263 ||  || — || December 14, 2001 || Socorro || LINEAR || FLO || align=right data-sort-value="0.99" | 990 m || 
|-id=264 bgcolor=#d6d6d6
| 302264 ||  || — || December 14, 2001 || Socorro || LINEAR || — || align=right | 3.6 km || 
|-id=265 bgcolor=#fefefe
| 302265 ||  || — || December 14, 2001 || Socorro || LINEAR || — || align=right data-sort-value="0.71" | 710 m || 
|-id=266 bgcolor=#fefefe
| 302266 ||  || — || December 14, 2001 || Socorro || LINEAR || — || align=right | 1.1 km || 
|-id=267 bgcolor=#d6d6d6
| 302267 ||  || — || December 14, 2001 || Socorro || LINEAR || — || align=right | 4.6 km || 
|-id=268 bgcolor=#fefefe
| 302268 ||  || — || December 14, 2001 || Socorro || LINEAR || — || align=right data-sort-value="0.82" | 820 m || 
|-id=269 bgcolor=#d6d6d6
| 302269 ||  || — || December 14, 2001 || Socorro || LINEAR || — || align=right | 3.6 km || 
|-id=270 bgcolor=#fefefe
| 302270 ||  || — || December 14, 2001 || Socorro || LINEAR || NYS || align=right data-sort-value="0.71" | 710 m || 
|-id=271 bgcolor=#d6d6d6
| 302271 ||  || — || December 14, 2001 || Socorro || LINEAR || — || align=right | 3.2 km || 
|-id=272 bgcolor=#d6d6d6
| 302272 ||  || — || December 14, 2001 || Socorro || LINEAR || — || align=right | 3.0 km || 
|-id=273 bgcolor=#d6d6d6
| 302273 ||  || — || December 14, 2001 || Socorro || LINEAR || ALA || align=right | 5.1 km || 
|-id=274 bgcolor=#fefefe
| 302274 ||  || — || December 14, 2001 || Socorro || LINEAR || FLO || align=right data-sort-value="0.74" | 740 m || 
|-id=275 bgcolor=#fefefe
| 302275 ||  || — || December 14, 2001 || Socorro || LINEAR || V || align=right data-sort-value="0.80" | 800 m || 
|-id=276 bgcolor=#fefefe
| 302276 ||  || — || December 14, 2001 || Socorro || LINEAR || V || align=right | 1.1 km || 
|-id=277 bgcolor=#d6d6d6
| 302277 ||  || — || December 14, 2001 || Socorro || LINEAR || — || align=right | 4.3 km || 
|-id=278 bgcolor=#fefefe
| 302278 ||  || — || December 15, 2001 || Socorro || LINEAR || — || align=right | 1.1 km || 
|-id=279 bgcolor=#fefefe
| 302279 ||  || — || December 15, 2001 || Socorro || LINEAR || — || align=right | 1.1 km || 
|-id=280 bgcolor=#fefefe
| 302280 ||  || — || December 15, 2001 || Socorro || LINEAR || — || align=right | 1.3 km || 
|-id=281 bgcolor=#d6d6d6
| 302281 ||  || — || December 15, 2001 || Socorro || LINEAR || EOS || align=right | 2.3 km || 
|-id=282 bgcolor=#fefefe
| 302282 ||  || — || December 15, 2001 || Socorro || LINEAR || — || align=right data-sort-value="0.87" | 870 m || 
|-id=283 bgcolor=#d6d6d6
| 302283 ||  || — || December 14, 2001 || Socorro || LINEAR || EOS || align=right | 2.4 km || 
|-id=284 bgcolor=#d6d6d6
| 302284 ||  || — || December 15, 2001 || Socorro || LINEAR || — || align=right | 2.7 km || 
|-id=285 bgcolor=#d6d6d6
| 302285 ||  || — || December 14, 2001 || Socorro || LINEAR || — || align=right | 2.9 km || 
|-id=286 bgcolor=#d6d6d6
| 302286 ||  || — || December 10, 2001 || Socorro || LINEAR || — || align=right | 3.7 km || 
|-id=287 bgcolor=#fefefe
| 302287 ||  || — || December 18, 2001 || Socorro || LINEAR || H || align=right data-sort-value="0.86" | 860 m || 
|-id=288 bgcolor=#fefefe
| 302288 ||  || — || December 17, 2001 || Socorro || LINEAR || — || align=right data-sort-value="0.95" | 950 m || 
|-id=289 bgcolor=#d6d6d6
| 302289 ||  || — || December 18, 2001 || Socorro || LINEAR || KOR || align=right | 1.7 km || 
|-id=290 bgcolor=#d6d6d6
| 302290 ||  || — || December 18, 2001 || Socorro || LINEAR || — || align=right | 3.0 km || 
|-id=291 bgcolor=#fefefe
| 302291 ||  || — || December 18, 2001 || Socorro || LINEAR || FLO || align=right data-sort-value="0.68" | 680 m || 
|-id=292 bgcolor=#d6d6d6
| 302292 ||  || — || December 18, 2001 || Socorro || LINEAR || — || align=right | 4.9 km || 
|-id=293 bgcolor=#fefefe
| 302293 ||  || — || December 18, 2001 || Socorro || LINEAR || — || align=right | 1.0 km || 
|-id=294 bgcolor=#d6d6d6
| 302294 ||  || — || December 18, 2001 || Socorro || LINEAR || URS || align=right | 4.2 km || 
|-id=295 bgcolor=#d6d6d6
| 302295 ||  || — || December 18, 2001 || Socorro || LINEAR || — || align=right | 4.0 km || 
|-id=296 bgcolor=#d6d6d6
| 302296 ||  || — || December 18, 2001 || Socorro || LINEAR || — || align=right | 2.7 km || 
|-id=297 bgcolor=#fefefe
| 302297 ||  || — || December 18, 2001 || Socorro || LINEAR || — || align=right | 1.2 km || 
|-id=298 bgcolor=#fefefe
| 302298 ||  || — || December 18, 2001 || Socorro || LINEAR || FLO || align=right data-sort-value="0.77" | 770 m || 
|-id=299 bgcolor=#d6d6d6
| 302299 ||  || — || December 18, 2001 || Socorro || LINEAR || — || align=right | 5.1 km || 
|-id=300 bgcolor=#fefefe
| 302300 ||  || — || December 18, 2001 || Socorro || LINEAR || — || align=right data-sort-value="0.85" | 850 m || 
|}

302301–302400 

|-bgcolor=#d6d6d6
| 302301 ||  || — || December 19, 2001 || Kitt Peak || Spacewatch || — || align=right | 3.3 km || 
|-id=302 bgcolor=#d6d6d6
| 302302 ||  || — || December 17, 2001 || Socorro || LINEAR || — || align=right | 3.8 km || 
|-id=303 bgcolor=#d6d6d6
| 302303 ||  || — || December 18, 2001 || Socorro || LINEAR || — || align=right | 5.3 km || 
|-id=304 bgcolor=#fefefe
| 302304 ||  || — || December 18, 2001 || Anderson Mesa || LONEOS || — || align=right | 1.1 km || 
|-id=305 bgcolor=#fefefe
| 302305 ||  || — || December 17, 2001 || Socorro || LINEAR || — || align=right | 1.0 km || 
|-id=306 bgcolor=#fefefe
| 302306 ||  || — || December 17, 2001 || Socorro || LINEAR || — || align=right data-sort-value="0.87" | 870 m || 
|-id=307 bgcolor=#d6d6d6
| 302307 ||  || — || December 20, 2001 || Socorro || LINEAR || — || align=right | 4.2 km || 
|-id=308 bgcolor=#d6d6d6
| 302308 ||  || — || December 19, 2001 || Palomar || NEAT || MEL || align=right | 5.1 km || 
|-id=309 bgcolor=#fefefe
| 302309 ||  || — || December 18, 2001 || Apache Point || SDSS || FLO || align=right data-sort-value="0.58" | 580 m || 
|-id=310 bgcolor=#d6d6d6
| 302310 ||  || — || December 16, 2001 || Palomar || NEAT || — || align=right | 3.6 km || 
|-id=311 bgcolor=#FFC2E0
| 302311 ||  || — || January 3, 2002 || Socorro || LINEAR || APO || align=right data-sort-value="0.47" | 470 m || 
|-id=312 bgcolor=#fefefe
| 302312 ||  || — || January 9, 2002 || Socorro || LINEAR || H || align=right | 1.4 km || 
|-id=313 bgcolor=#fefefe
| 302313 ||  || — || January 11, 2002 || Desert Eagle || W. K. Y. Yeung || — || align=right | 1.4 km || 
|-id=314 bgcolor=#d6d6d6
| 302314 ||  || — || January 8, 2002 || Haleakala || NEAT || — || align=right | 3.8 km || 
|-id=315 bgcolor=#d6d6d6
| 302315 ||  || — || January 9, 2002 || Socorro || LINEAR || — || align=right | 3.4 km || 
|-id=316 bgcolor=#d6d6d6
| 302316 ||  || — || January 9, 2002 || Socorro || LINEAR || EOS || align=right | 2.9 km || 
|-id=317 bgcolor=#d6d6d6
| 302317 ||  || — || January 9, 2002 || Socorro || LINEAR || HYG || align=right | 4.1 km || 
|-id=318 bgcolor=#fefefe
| 302318 ||  || — || January 9, 2002 || Socorro || LINEAR || — || align=right data-sort-value="0.83" | 830 m || 
|-id=319 bgcolor=#d6d6d6
| 302319 ||  || — || January 9, 2002 || Socorro || LINEAR || — || align=right | 4.0 km || 
|-id=320 bgcolor=#fefefe
| 302320 ||  || — || January 9, 2002 || Socorro || LINEAR || FLO || align=right | 1.0 km || 
|-id=321 bgcolor=#d6d6d6
| 302321 ||  || — || January 9, 2002 || Socorro || LINEAR || THB || align=right | 4.3 km || 
|-id=322 bgcolor=#d6d6d6
| 302322 ||  || — || January 9, 2002 || Campo Imperatore || CINEOS || — || align=right | 3.5 km || 
|-id=323 bgcolor=#d6d6d6
| 302323 ||  || — || January 8, 2002 || Socorro || LINEAR || EOS || align=right | 2.5 km || 
|-id=324 bgcolor=#d6d6d6
| 302324 ||  || — || December 19, 2001 || Socorro || LINEAR || — || align=right | 3.8 km || 
|-id=325 bgcolor=#fefefe
| 302325 ||  || — || January 8, 2002 || Socorro || LINEAR || FLO || align=right data-sort-value="0.86" | 860 m || 
|-id=326 bgcolor=#fefefe
| 302326 ||  || — || January 8, 2002 || Socorro || LINEAR || — || align=right data-sort-value="0.74" | 740 m || 
|-id=327 bgcolor=#d6d6d6
| 302327 ||  || — || January 8, 2002 || Socorro || LINEAR || — || align=right | 4.3 km || 
|-id=328 bgcolor=#d6d6d6
| 302328 ||  || — || January 8, 2002 || Socorro || LINEAR || — || align=right | 3.8 km || 
|-id=329 bgcolor=#d6d6d6
| 302329 ||  || — || January 9, 2002 || Socorro || LINEAR || HYG || align=right | 3.5 km || 
|-id=330 bgcolor=#fefefe
| 302330 ||  || — || January 9, 2002 || Socorro || LINEAR || FLO || align=right data-sort-value="0.94" | 940 m || 
|-id=331 bgcolor=#d6d6d6
| 302331 ||  || — || January 8, 2002 || Socorro || LINEAR || HYG || align=right | 3.2 km || 
|-id=332 bgcolor=#fefefe
| 302332 ||  || — || January 8, 2002 || Socorro || LINEAR || — || align=right data-sort-value="0.94" | 940 m || 
|-id=333 bgcolor=#fefefe
| 302333 ||  || — || January 8, 2002 || Socorro || LINEAR || — || align=right data-sort-value="0.91" | 910 m || 
|-id=334 bgcolor=#fefefe
| 302334 ||  || — || January 9, 2002 || Socorro || LINEAR || FLO || align=right data-sort-value="0.73" | 730 m || 
|-id=335 bgcolor=#fefefe
| 302335 ||  || — || January 9, 2002 || Socorro || LINEAR || FLO || align=right data-sort-value="0.67" | 670 m || 
|-id=336 bgcolor=#d6d6d6
| 302336 ||  || — || January 9, 2002 || Socorro || LINEAR || — || align=right | 3.8 km || 
|-id=337 bgcolor=#d6d6d6
| 302337 ||  || — || January 9, 2002 || Socorro || LINEAR || — || align=right | 5.4 km || 
|-id=338 bgcolor=#d6d6d6
| 302338 ||  || — || January 9, 2002 || Socorro || LINEAR || — || align=right | 3.5 km || 
|-id=339 bgcolor=#fefefe
| 302339 ||  || — || January 15, 2002 || Kingsnake || J. V. McClusky || H || align=right data-sort-value="0.85" | 850 m || 
|-id=340 bgcolor=#d6d6d6
| 302340 ||  || — || January 9, 2002 || Socorro || LINEAR || EOS || align=right | 2.7 km || 
|-id=341 bgcolor=#d6d6d6
| 302341 ||  || — || January 9, 2002 || Socorro || LINEAR || HYG || align=right | 3.3 km || 
|-id=342 bgcolor=#d6d6d6
| 302342 ||  || — || January 9, 2002 || Socorro || LINEAR || EOS || align=right | 2.7 km || 
|-id=343 bgcolor=#fefefe
| 302343 ||  || — || January 13, 2002 || Socorro || LINEAR || — || align=right data-sort-value="0.68" | 680 m || 
|-id=344 bgcolor=#d6d6d6
| 302344 ||  || — || January 13, 2002 || Palomar || NEAT || — || align=right | 4.6 km || 
|-id=345 bgcolor=#fefefe
| 302345 ||  || — || January 13, 2002 || Socorro || LINEAR || NYS || align=right | 1.0 km || 
|-id=346 bgcolor=#fefefe
| 302346 ||  || — || January 14, 2002 || Socorro || LINEAR || NYS || align=right data-sort-value="0.72" | 720 m || 
|-id=347 bgcolor=#d6d6d6
| 302347 ||  || — || January 14, 2002 || Socorro || LINEAR || — || align=right | 3.1 km || 
|-id=348 bgcolor=#fefefe
| 302348 ||  || — || January 14, 2002 || Socorro || LINEAR || — || align=right data-sort-value="0.93" | 930 m || 
|-id=349 bgcolor=#d6d6d6
| 302349 ||  || — || January 14, 2002 || Socorro || LINEAR || EOS || align=right | 3.1 km || 
|-id=350 bgcolor=#fefefe
| 302350 ||  || — || January 5, 2002 || Kitt Peak || Spacewatch || — || align=right data-sort-value="0.85" | 850 m || 
|-id=351 bgcolor=#d6d6d6
| 302351 ||  || — || January 12, 2002 || Kitt Peak || Spacewatch || HYG || align=right | 3.3 km || 
|-id=352 bgcolor=#d6d6d6
| 302352 ||  || — || January 19, 2002 || Kitt Peak || Spacewatch || — || align=right | 2.8 km || 
|-id=353 bgcolor=#fefefe
| 302353 ||  || — || January 18, 2002 || Anderson Mesa || LONEOS || — || align=right | 1.2 km || 
|-id=354 bgcolor=#fefefe
| 302354 ||  || — || January 18, 2002 || Anderson Mesa || LONEOS || PHO || align=right | 1.8 km || 
|-id=355 bgcolor=#d6d6d6
| 302355 ||  || — || January 18, 2002 || Socorro || LINEAR || — || align=right | 3.7 km || 
|-id=356 bgcolor=#fefefe
| 302356 ||  || — || January 21, 2002 || Socorro || LINEAR || V || align=right data-sort-value="0.83" | 830 m || 
|-id=357 bgcolor=#fefefe
| 302357 ||  || — || January 26, 2002 || Socorro || LINEAR || PHO || align=right | 1.3 km || 
|-id=358 bgcolor=#d6d6d6
| 302358 ||  || — || January 17, 2002 || Palomar || NEAT || — || align=right | 4.8 km || 
|-id=359 bgcolor=#fefefe
| 302359 ||  || — || January 20, 2002 || Anderson Mesa || LONEOS || — || align=right | 1.3 km || 
|-id=360 bgcolor=#d6d6d6
| 302360 ||  || — || January 19, 2002 || Anderson Mesa || LONEOS || — || align=right | 4.5 km || 
|-id=361 bgcolor=#d6d6d6
| 302361 ||  || — || January 22, 2002 || Kitt Peak || Spacewatch || — || align=right | 3.8 km || 
|-id=362 bgcolor=#d6d6d6
| 302362 ||  || — || January 19, 2002 || Anderson Mesa || LONEOS || — || align=right | 4.2 km || 
|-id=363 bgcolor=#d6d6d6
| 302363 ||  || — || February 1, 2002 || Socorro || LINEAR || Tj (2.9) || align=right | 4.3 km || 
|-id=364 bgcolor=#d6d6d6
| 302364 ||  || — || February 3, 2002 || Palomar || NEAT || — || align=right | 3.6 km || 
|-id=365 bgcolor=#d6d6d6
| 302365 ||  || — || February 6, 2002 || Kitt Peak || Spacewatch || VER || align=right | 3.1 km || 
|-id=366 bgcolor=#FA8072
| 302366 ||  || — || February 6, 2002 || Socorro || LINEAR || — || align=right | 2.2 km || 
|-id=367 bgcolor=#fefefe
| 302367 ||  || — || February 8, 2002 || Fountain Hills || C. W. Juels, P. R. Holvorcem || — || align=right | 1.6 km || 
|-id=368 bgcolor=#d6d6d6
| 302368 ||  || — || February 4, 2002 || Palomar || NEAT || — || align=right | 3.1 km || 
|-id=369 bgcolor=#d6d6d6
| 302369 ||  || — || February 4, 2002 || Palomar || NEAT || TIR || align=right | 4.5 km || 
|-id=370 bgcolor=#fefefe
| 302370 ||  || — || February 5, 2002 || Palomar || NEAT || — || align=right data-sort-value="0.94" | 940 m || 
|-id=371 bgcolor=#d6d6d6
| 302371 ||  || — || February 5, 2002 || Palomar || NEAT || — || align=right | 3.6 km || 
|-id=372 bgcolor=#d6d6d6
| 302372 ||  || — || February 5, 2002 || Palomar || NEAT || — || align=right | 3.8 km || 
|-id=373 bgcolor=#d6d6d6
| 302373 ||  || — || February 6, 2002 || Socorro || LINEAR || — || align=right | 3.6 km || 
|-id=374 bgcolor=#d6d6d6
| 302374 ||  || — || February 7, 2002 || Palomar || NEAT || — || align=right | 4.0 km || 
|-id=375 bgcolor=#fefefe
| 302375 ||  || — || February 7, 2002 || Palomar || NEAT || H || align=right data-sort-value="0.85" | 850 m || 
|-id=376 bgcolor=#fefefe
| 302376 ||  || — || February 12, 2002 || Fountain Hills || C. W. Juels, P. R. Holvorcem || — || align=right | 1.9 km || 
|-id=377 bgcolor=#fefefe
| 302377 ||  || — || February 8, 2002 || Socorro || LINEAR || H || align=right | 1.1 km || 
|-id=378 bgcolor=#d6d6d6
| 302378 ||  || — || February 8, 2002 || Palomar || NEAT || — || align=right | 5.0 km || 
|-id=379 bgcolor=#d6d6d6
| 302379 ||  || — || February 12, 2002 || Desert Eagle || W. K. Y. Yeung || — || align=right | 3.6 km || 
|-id=380 bgcolor=#d6d6d6
| 302380 ||  || — || February 7, 2002 || Socorro || LINEAR || Tj (2.94) || align=right | 4.8 km || 
|-id=381 bgcolor=#fefefe
| 302381 ||  || — || February 11, 2002 || Socorro || LINEAR || H || align=right data-sort-value="0.78" | 780 m || 
|-id=382 bgcolor=#d6d6d6
| 302382 ||  || — || February 6, 2002 || Socorro || LINEAR || — || align=right | 4.5 km || 
|-id=383 bgcolor=#d6d6d6
| 302383 ||  || — || February 6, 2002 || Socorro || LINEAR || — || align=right | 4.1 km || 
|-id=384 bgcolor=#d6d6d6
| 302384 ||  || — || February 6, 2002 || Socorro || LINEAR || LIX || align=right | 6.5 km || 
|-id=385 bgcolor=#d6d6d6
| 302385 ||  || — || February 6, 2002 || Socorro || LINEAR || — || align=right | 4.7 km || 
|-id=386 bgcolor=#d6d6d6
| 302386 ||  || — || February 7, 2002 || Socorro || LINEAR || — || align=right | 3.7 km || 
|-id=387 bgcolor=#fefefe
| 302387 ||  || — || February 7, 2002 || Socorro || LINEAR || MAS || align=right data-sort-value="0.87" | 870 m || 
|-id=388 bgcolor=#fefefe
| 302388 ||  || — || February 7, 2002 || Socorro || LINEAR || V || align=right data-sort-value="0.86" | 860 m || 
|-id=389 bgcolor=#d6d6d6
| 302389 ||  || — || February 7, 2002 || Socorro || LINEAR || — || align=right | 3.8 km || 
|-id=390 bgcolor=#fefefe
| 302390 ||  || — || February 7, 2002 || Socorro || LINEAR || V || align=right data-sort-value="0.85" | 850 m || 
|-id=391 bgcolor=#fefefe
| 302391 ||  || — || February 7, 2002 || Socorro || LINEAR || — || align=right | 2.3 km || 
|-id=392 bgcolor=#fefefe
| 302392 ||  || — || February 7, 2002 || Socorro || LINEAR || FLO || align=right data-sort-value="0.84" | 840 m || 
|-id=393 bgcolor=#fefefe
| 302393 ||  || — || February 7, 2002 || Socorro || LINEAR || V || align=right | 1.0 km || 
|-id=394 bgcolor=#d6d6d6
| 302394 ||  || — || February 7, 2002 || Socorro || LINEAR || — || align=right | 3.4 km || 
|-id=395 bgcolor=#fefefe
| 302395 ||  || — || February 7, 2002 || Socorro || LINEAR || NYS || align=right data-sort-value="0.91" | 910 m || 
|-id=396 bgcolor=#d6d6d6
| 302396 ||  || — || February 7, 2002 || Socorro || LINEAR || — || align=right | 3.1 km || 
|-id=397 bgcolor=#fefefe
| 302397 ||  || — || February 7, 2002 || Socorro || LINEAR || — || align=right | 1.0 km || 
|-id=398 bgcolor=#fefefe
| 302398 ||  || — || February 7, 2002 || Socorro || LINEAR || — || align=right | 1.3 km || 
|-id=399 bgcolor=#fefefe
| 302399 ||  || — || February 7, 2002 || Socorro || LINEAR || PHO || align=right | 1.1 km || 
|-id=400 bgcolor=#fefefe
| 302400 ||  || — || February 7, 2002 || Socorro || LINEAR || — || align=right | 2.8 km || 
|}

302401–302500 

|-bgcolor=#fefefe
| 302401 ||  || — || February 7, 2002 || Socorro || LINEAR || — || align=right | 1.4 km || 
|-id=402 bgcolor=#d6d6d6
| 302402 ||  || — || February 8, 2002 || Socorro || LINEAR || — || align=right | 4.7 km || 
|-id=403 bgcolor=#fefefe
| 302403 ||  || — || February 7, 2002 || Socorro || LINEAR || — || align=right data-sort-value="0.90" | 900 m || 
|-id=404 bgcolor=#d6d6d6
| 302404 ||  || — || February 7, 2002 || Socorro || LINEAR || HYG || align=right | 3.6 km || 
|-id=405 bgcolor=#fefefe
| 302405 ||  || — || February 7, 2002 || Socorro || LINEAR || — || align=right data-sort-value="0.97" | 970 m || 
|-id=406 bgcolor=#fefefe
| 302406 ||  || — || February 8, 2002 || Kitt Peak || Spacewatch || NYS || align=right data-sort-value="0.61" | 610 m || 
|-id=407 bgcolor=#d6d6d6
| 302407 ||  || — || February 6, 2002 || Socorro || LINEAR || URS || align=right | 5.1 km || 
|-id=408 bgcolor=#fefefe
| 302408 ||  || — || February 7, 2002 || Socorro || LINEAR || — || align=right data-sort-value="0.77" | 770 m || 
|-id=409 bgcolor=#fefefe
| 302409 ||  || — || February 7, 2002 || Socorro || LINEAR || — || align=right | 1.1 km || 
|-id=410 bgcolor=#fefefe
| 302410 ||  || — || February 8, 2002 || Socorro || LINEAR || NYS || align=right data-sort-value="0.96" | 960 m || 
|-id=411 bgcolor=#d6d6d6
| 302411 ||  || — || February 10, 2002 || Socorro || LINEAR || — || align=right | 4.1 km || 
|-id=412 bgcolor=#fefefe
| 302412 ||  || — || February 10, 2002 || Socorro || LINEAR || V || align=right data-sort-value="0.98" | 980 m || 
|-id=413 bgcolor=#fefefe
| 302413 ||  || — || February 10, 2002 || Socorro || LINEAR || NYS || align=right data-sort-value="0.73" | 730 m || 
|-id=414 bgcolor=#d6d6d6
| 302414 ||  || — || February 10, 2002 || Socorro || LINEAR || — || align=right | 2.8 km || 
|-id=415 bgcolor=#fefefe
| 302415 ||  || — || February 10, 2002 || Socorro || LINEAR || V || align=right | 1.0 km || 
|-id=416 bgcolor=#fefefe
| 302416 ||  || — || February 10, 2002 || Socorro || LINEAR || FLO || align=right data-sort-value="0.64" | 640 m || 
|-id=417 bgcolor=#d6d6d6
| 302417 ||  || — || February 10, 2002 || Socorro || LINEAR || — || align=right | 3.3 km || 
|-id=418 bgcolor=#fefefe
| 302418 ||  || — || February 10, 2002 || Socorro || LINEAR || — || align=right | 1.2 km || 
|-id=419 bgcolor=#d6d6d6
| 302419 ||  || — || February 11, 2002 || Socorro || LINEAR || HYG || align=right | 2.8 km || 
|-id=420 bgcolor=#fefefe
| 302420 ||  || — || February 6, 2002 || Kitt Peak || Spacewatch || — || align=right data-sort-value="0.93" | 930 m || 
|-id=421 bgcolor=#d6d6d6
| 302421 ||  || — || February 14, 2002 || Cerro Tololo || DLS || — || align=right | 3.2 km || 
|-id=422 bgcolor=#d6d6d6
| 302422 ||  || — || February 14, 2002 || Haleakala || NEAT || — || align=right | 3.8 km || 
|-id=423 bgcolor=#d6d6d6
| 302423 ||  || — || February 14, 2002 || Kitt Peak || Spacewatch || SYL7:4 || align=right | 3.7 km || 
|-id=424 bgcolor=#d6d6d6
| 302424 ||  || — || February 4, 2002 || Palomar || NEAT || HYG || align=right | 3.5 km || 
|-id=425 bgcolor=#d6d6d6
| 302425 ||  || — || February 8, 2002 || Kitt Peak || Spacewatch || — || align=right | 3.0 km || 
|-id=426 bgcolor=#fefefe
| 302426 ||  || — || February 11, 2002 || Socorro || LINEAR || — || align=right | 1.00 km || 
|-id=427 bgcolor=#d6d6d6
| 302427 ||  || — || February 10, 2002 || Socorro || LINEAR || THM || align=right | 2.6 km || 
|-id=428 bgcolor=#d6d6d6
| 302428 ||  || — || February 11, 2002 || Socorro || LINEAR || — || align=right | 4.0 km || 
|-id=429 bgcolor=#fefefe
| 302429 ||  || — || February 11, 2002 || Socorro || LINEAR || FLO || align=right data-sort-value="0.77" | 770 m || 
|-id=430 bgcolor=#d6d6d6
| 302430 ||  || — || February 12, 2002 || Socorro || LINEAR || HYG || align=right | 3.4 km || 
|-id=431 bgcolor=#fefefe
| 302431 ||  || — || February 3, 2002 || Palomar || NEAT || — || align=right | 1.2 km || 
|-id=432 bgcolor=#d6d6d6
| 302432 ||  || — || August 28, 2005 || Kitt Peak || Spacewatch || HYG || align=right | 4.0 km || 
|-id=433 bgcolor=#d6d6d6
| 302433 ||  || — || February 19, 2002 || Socorro || LINEAR || — || align=right | 4.2 km || 
|-id=434 bgcolor=#fefefe
| 302434 ||  || — || February 20, 2002 || Socorro || LINEAR || — || align=right | 1.0 km || 
|-id=435 bgcolor=#fefefe
| 302435 ||  || — || February 18, 2002 || Cima Ekar || ADAS || V || align=right data-sort-value="0.71" | 710 m || 
|-id=436 bgcolor=#fefefe
| 302436 ||  || — || March 13, 2002 || Socorro || LINEAR || H || align=right data-sort-value="0.70" | 700 m || 
|-id=437 bgcolor=#fefefe
| 302437 ||  || — || March 9, 2002 || Kitt Peak || Spacewatch || — || align=right | 1.2 km || 
|-id=438 bgcolor=#d6d6d6
| 302438 ||  || — || March 5, 2002 || Kitt Peak || Spacewatch || THM || align=right | 2.4 km || 
|-id=439 bgcolor=#d6d6d6
| 302439 ||  || — || March 9, 2002 || Socorro || LINEAR || TIR || align=right | 4.1 km || 
|-id=440 bgcolor=#fefefe
| 302440 ||  || — || March 9, 2002 || Socorro || LINEAR || V || align=right | 1.0 km || 
|-id=441 bgcolor=#fefefe
| 302441 ||  || — || March 10, 2002 || Socorro || LINEAR || — || align=right | 1.2 km || 
|-id=442 bgcolor=#fefefe
| 302442 ||  || — || March 12, 2002 || Socorro || LINEAR || V || align=right data-sort-value="0.84" | 840 m || 
|-id=443 bgcolor=#d6d6d6
| 302443 ||  || — || March 13, 2002 || Socorro || LINEAR || — || align=right | 3.3 km || 
|-id=444 bgcolor=#fefefe
| 302444 ||  || — || March 13, 2002 || Socorro || LINEAR || — || align=right data-sort-value="0.83" | 830 m || 
|-id=445 bgcolor=#fefefe
| 302445 ||  || — || March 13, 2002 || Socorro || LINEAR || V || align=right data-sort-value="0.72" | 720 m || 
|-id=446 bgcolor=#fefefe
| 302446 ||  || — || March 13, 2002 || Socorro || LINEAR || NYS || align=right data-sort-value="0.89" | 890 m || 
|-id=447 bgcolor=#fefefe
| 302447 ||  || — || March 13, 2002 || Socorro || LINEAR || — || align=right | 1.2 km || 
|-id=448 bgcolor=#fefefe
| 302448 ||  || — || March 13, 2002 || Palomar || NEAT || MAS || align=right data-sort-value="0.85" | 850 m || 
|-id=449 bgcolor=#d6d6d6
| 302449 ||  || — || March 12, 2002 || Socorro || LINEAR || HYG || align=right | 4.2 km || 
|-id=450 bgcolor=#fefefe
| 302450 ||  || — || March 12, 2002 || Socorro || LINEAR || NYS || align=right data-sort-value="0.86" | 860 m || 
|-id=451 bgcolor=#fefefe
| 302451 ||  || — || March 14, 2002 || Socorro || LINEAR || NYS || align=right data-sort-value="0.73" | 730 m || 
|-id=452 bgcolor=#d6d6d6
| 302452 ||  || — || March 14, 2002 || Socorro || LINEAR || TIR || align=right | 3.6 km || 
|-id=453 bgcolor=#fefefe
| 302453 ||  || — || March 4, 2002 || Catalina || CSS || — || align=right | 1.3 km || 
|-id=454 bgcolor=#fefefe
| 302454 ||  || — || March 6, 2002 || Socorro || LINEAR || — || align=right data-sort-value="0.87" | 870 m || 
|-id=455 bgcolor=#d6d6d6
| 302455 ||  || — || March 6, 2002 || Palomar || NEAT || — || align=right | 4.1 km || 
|-id=456 bgcolor=#fefefe
| 302456 ||  || — || March 9, 2002 || Catalina || CSS || — || align=right | 1.2 km || 
|-id=457 bgcolor=#d6d6d6
| 302457 ||  || — || March 9, 2002 || Kitt Peak || Spacewatch || — || align=right | 3.4 km || 
|-id=458 bgcolor=#fefefe
| 302458 ||  || — || March 10, 2002 || Kitt Peak || Spacewatch || CLA || align=right | 2.1 km || 
|-id=459 bgcolor=#fefefe
| 302459 ||  || — || March 10, 2002 || Kitt Peak || Spacewatch || V || align=right data-sort-value="0.82" | 820 m || 
|-id=460 bgcolor=#fefefe
| 302460 ||  || — || March 11, 2002 || Kitt Peak || Spacewatch || — || align=right | 1.1 km || 
|-id=461 bgcolor=#d6d6d6
| 302461 ||  || — || March 12, 2002 || Anderson Mesa || LONEOS || — || align=right | 2.6 km || 
|-id=462 bgcolor=#fefefe
| 302462 ||  || — || March 12, 2002 || Palomar || NEAT || V || align=right data-sort-value="0.90" | 900 m || 
|-id=463 bgcolor=#d6d6d6
| 302463 ||  || — || March 12, 2002 || Palomar || NEAT || — || align=right | 4.3 km || 
|-id=464 bgcolor=#d6d6d6
| 302464 ||  || — || March 12, 2002 || Kitt Peak || Spacewatch || HYG || align=right | 3.8 km || 
|-id=465 bgcolor=#fefefe
| 302465 ||  || — || March 13, 2002 || Needville || Needville Obs. || — || align=right data-sort-value="0.75" | 750 m || 
|-id=466 bgcolor=#fefefe
| 302466 ||  || — || March 12, 2002 || Palomar || NEAT || MAS || align=right data-sort-value="0.64" | 640 m || 
|-id=467 bgcolor=#d6d6d6
| 302467 ||  || — || March 12, 2002 || Palomar || NEAT || HYG || align=right | 3.5 km || 
|-id=468 bgcolor=#fefefe
| 302468 ||  || — || March 13, 2002 || Socorro || LINEAR || — || align=right | 1.2 km || 
|-id=469 bgcolor=#fefefe
| 302469 ||  || — || March 15, 2002 || Palomar || NEAT || — || align=right data-sort-value="0.89" | 890 m || 
|-id=470 bgcolor=#fefefe
| 302470 ||  || — || March 13, 2002 || Socorro || LINEAR || NYS || align=right data-sort-value="0.88" | 880 m || 
|-id=471 bgcolor=#d6d6d6
| 302471 ||  || — || March 31, 2002 || Palomar || NEAT || EUP || align=right | 6.6 km || 
|-id=472 bgcolor=#fefefe
| 302472 ||  || — || March 16, 2002 || Socorro || LINEAR || — || align=right | 1.2 km || 
|-id=473 bgcolor=#d6d6d6
| 302473 ||  || — || March 16, 2002 || Haleakala || NEAT || — || align=right | 4.8 km || 
|-id=474 bgcolor=#d6d6d6
| 302474 ||  || — || March 18, 2002 || Kitt Peak || M. W. Buie || — || align=right | 3.6 km || 
|-id=475 bgcolor=#d6d6d6
| 302475 ||  || — || March 19, 2002 || Palomar || NEAT || — || align=right | 6.4 km || 
|-id=476 bgcolor=#d6d6d6
| 302476 ||  || — || March 19, 2002 || Palomar || NEAT || TIR || align=right | 4.2 km || 
|-id=477 bgcolor=#fefefe
| 302477 ||  || — || March 19, 2002 || Anderson Mesa || LONEOS || NYS || align=right | 1.1 km || 
|-id=478 bgcolor=#fefefe
| 302478 ||  || — || March 23, 2002 || Socorro || LINEAR || — || align=right | 1.1 km || 
|-id=479 bgcolor=#fefefe
| 302479 ||  || — || April 15, 2002 || Socorro || LINEAR || H || align=right data-sort-value="0.95" | 950 m || 
|-id=480 bgcolor=#fefefe
| 302480 ||  || — || April 15, 2002 || Palomar || NEAT || — || align=right | 1.1 km || 
|-id=481 bgcolor=#fefefe
| 302481 ||  || — || April 15, 2002 || Palomar || NEAT || — || align=right | 1.1 km || 
|-id=482 bgcolor=#d6d6d6
| 302482 ||  || — || April 13, 2002 || Kitt Peak || Spacewatch || — || align=right | 3.1 km || 
|-id=483 bgcolor=#fefefe
| 302483 ||  || — || April 4, 2002 || Palomar || NEAT || — || align=right | 1.4 km || 
|-id=484 bgcolor=#fefefe
| 302484 ||  || — || April 4, 2002 || Palomar || NEAT || NYS || align=right data-sort-value="0.74" | 740 m || 
|-id=485 bgcolor=#fefefe
| 302485 ||  || — || April 5, 2002 || Palomar || NEAT || — || align=right | 1.1 km || 
|-id=486 bgcolor=#fefefe
| 302486 ||  || — || April 8, 2002 || Palomar || NEAT || — || align=right | 1.1 km || 
|-id=487 bgcolor=#fefefe
| 302487 ||  || — || April 8, 2002 || Palomar || NEAT || MAS || align=right | 1.2 km || 
|-id=488 bgcolor=#fefefe
| 302488 ||  || — || April 8, 2002 || Palomar || NEAT || NYS || align=right data-sort-value="0.97" | 970 m || 
|-id=489 bgcolor=#fefefe
| 302489 ||  || — || April 9, 2002 || Palomar || NEAT || NYS || align=right data-sort-value="0.88" | 880 m || 
|-id=490 bgcolor=#fefefe
| 302490 ||  || — || April 9, 2002 || Socorro || LINEAR || FLO || align=right | 1.0 km || 
|-id=491 bgcolor=#E9E9E9
| 302491 ||  || — || April 10, 2002 || Socorro || LINEAR || — || align=right | 1.4 km || 
|-id=492 bgcolor=#fefefe
| 302492 ||  || — || April 10, 2002 || Socorro || LINEAR || — || align=right | 1.3 km || 
|-id=493 bgcolor=#fefefe
| 302493 ||  || — || April 8, 2002 || Palomar || NEAT || NYS || align=right data-sort-value="0.71" | 710 m || 
|-id=494 bgcolor=#fefefe
| 302494 ||  || — || April 9, 2002 || Socorro || LINEAR || — || align=right | 1.3 km || 
|-id=495 bgcolor=#fefefe
| 302495 ||  || — || April 9, 2002 || Socorro || LINEAR || — || align=right | 1.1 km || 
|-id=496 bgcolor=#fefefe
| 302496 ||  || — || April 10, 2002 || Socorro || LINEAR || MAS || align=right data-sort-value="0.85" | 850 m || 
|-id=497 bgcolor=#fefefe
| 302497 ||  || — || April 11, 2002 || Socorro || LINEAR || — || align=right | 1.1 km || 
|-id=498 bgcolor=#fefefe
| 302498 ||  || — || April 11, 2002 || Socorro || LINEAR || V || align=right data-sort-value="0.96" | 960 m || 
|-id=499 bgcolor=#fefefe
| 302499 ||  || — || April 12, 2002 || Palomar || NEAT || — || align=right | 1.1 km || 
|-id=500 bgcolor=#d6d6d6
| 302500 ||  || — || April 12, 2002 || Socorro || LINEAR || — || align=right | 3.5 km || 
|}

302501–302600 

|-bgcolor=#fefefe
| 302501 ||  || — || April 12, 2002 || Socorro || LINEAR || — || align=right data-sort-value="0.94" | 940 m || 
|-id=502 bgcolor=#fefefe
| 302502 ||  || — || April 12, 2002 || Socorro || LINEAR || — || align=right | 1.0 km || 
|-id=503 bgcolor=#fefefe
| 302503 ||  || — || April 12, 2002 || Socorro || LINEAR || — || align=right | 1.4 km || 
|-id=504 bgcolor=#fefefe
| 302504 ||  || — || April 14, 2002 || Socorro || LINEAR || V || align=right data-sort-value="0.73" | 730 m || 
|-id=505 bgcolor=#fefefe
| 302505 ||  || — || April 14, 2002 || Kitt Peak || Spacewatch || — || align=right | 1.2 km || 
|-id=506 bgcolor=#fefefe
| 302506 ||  || — || April 14, 2002 || Palomar || NEAT || NYS || align=right data-sort-value="0.92" | 920 m || 
|-id=507 bgcolor=#fefefe
| 302507 ||  || — || April 9, 2002 || Socorro || LINEAR || — || align=right | 1.3 km || 
|-id=508 bgcolor=#d6d6d6
| 302508 ||  || — || April 8, 2002 || Palomar || NEAT || EUP || align=right | 4.1 km || 
|-id=509 bgcolor=#d6d6d6
| 302509 ||  || — || April 3, 2002 || Palomar || NEAT || HYG || align=right | 3.3 km || 
|-id=510 bgcolor=#d6d6d6
| 302510 ||  || — || April 2, 2002 || Palomar || NEAT || — || align=right | 4.0 km || 
|-id=511 bgcolor=#fefefe
| 302511 ||  || — || September 21, 2003 || Kitt Peak || Spacewatch || — || align=right | 1.3 km || 
|-id=512 bgcolor=#fefefe
| 302512 ||  || — || April 16, 2002 || Socorro || LINEAR || — || align=right | 1.3 km || 
|-id=513 bgcolor=#fefefe
| 302513 ||  || — || April 18, 2002 || Kitt Peak || Spacewatch || MAS || align=right | 1.1 km || 
|-id=514 bgcolor=#fefefe
| 302514 ||  || — || May 9, 2002 || Palomar || NEAT || — || align=right | 1.3 km || 
|-id=515 bgcolor=#fefefe
| 302515 ||  || — || May 10, 2002 || Socorro || LINEAR || — || align=right | 1.3 km || 
|-id=516 bgcolor=#fefefe
| 302516 ||  || — || May 7, 2002 || Socorro || LINEAR || — || align=right | 1.4 km || 
|-id=517 bgcolor=#fefefe
| 302517 ||  || — || May 8, 2002 || Socorro || LINEAR || H || align=right data-sort-value="0.86" | 860 m || 
|-id=518 bgcolor=#fefefe
| 302518 ||  || — || May 11, 2002 || Socorro || LINEAR || NYS || align=right | 1.1 km || 
|-id=519 bgcolor=#fefefe
| 302519 ||  || — || May 11, 2002 || Socorro || LINEAR || — || align=right | 1.3 km || 
|-id=520 bgcolor=#fefefe
| 302520 ||  || — || May 8, 2002 || Socorro || LINEAR || — || align=right | 2.4 km || 
|-id=521 bgcolor=#fefefe
| 302521 ||  || — || May 9, 2002 || Palomar || NEAT || — || align=right | 1.2 km || 
|-id=522 bgcolor=#E9E9E9
| 302522 ||  || — || May 13, 2002 || Palomar || NEAT || EUN || align=right | 1.6 km || 
|-id=523 bgcolor=#FFC2E0
| 302523 ||  || — || May 17, 2002 || Socorro || LINEAR || AMO +1km || align=right | 1.2 km || 
|-id=524 bgcolor=#fefefe
| 302524 ||  || — || May 16, 2002 || Socorro || LINEAR || — || align=right | 2.8 km || 
|-id=525 bgcolor=#E9E9E9
| 302525 ||  || — || April 20, 2010 || Kitt Peak || Spacewatch || — || align=right | 3.3 km || 
|-id=526 bgcolor=#E9E9E9
| 302526 ||  || — || June 5, 2002 || Socorro || LINEAR || — || align=right | 1.3 km || 
|-id=527 bgcolor=#E9E9E9
| 302527 ||  || — || June 8, 2002 || Socorro || LINEAR || — || align=right | 1.4 km || 
|-id=528 bgcolor=#E9E9E9
| 302528 ||  || — || June 8, 2002 || Socorro || LINEAR || — || align=right | 1.5 km || 
|-id=529 bgcolor=#E9E9E9
| 302529 ||  || — || June 10, 2002 || Socorro || LINEAR || — || align=right | 1.2 km || 
|-id=530 bgcolor=#FA8072
| 302530 ||  || — || June 13, 2002 || Campo Imperatore || CINEOS || — || align=right | 4.9 km || 
|-id=531 bgcolor=#FA8072
| 302531 ||  || — || June 13, 2002 || Palomar || NEAT || — || align=right | 2.8 km || 
|-id=532 bgcolor=#E9E9E9
| 302532 ||  || — || November 4, 2007 || Kitt Peak || Spacewatch || — || align=right | 1.3 km || 
|-id=533 bgcolor=#E9E9E9
| 302533 ||  || — || October 11, 2007 || Kitt Peak || Spacewatch || — || align=right | 1.4 km || 
|-id=534 bgcolor=#E9E9E9
| 302534 ||  || — || August 11, 1994 || La Silla || E. W. Elst || — || align=right | 1.1 km || 
|-id=535 bgcolor=#E9E9E9
| 302535 ||  || — || June 16, 2002 || Palomar || NEAT || — || align=right | 1.4 km || 
|-id=536 bgcolor=#E9E9E9
| 302536 ||  || — || May 23, 2002 || Palomar || NEAT || JUN || align=right | 1.2 km || 
|-id=537 bgcolor=#E9E9E9
| 302537 ||  || — || July 5, 2002 || Kitt Peak || Spacewatch || EUN || align=right | 1.6 km || 
|-id=538 bgcolor=#E9E9E9
| 302538 ||  || — || July 12, 2002 || Palomar || NEAT || — || align=right | 2.1 km || 
|-id=539 bgcolor=#E9E9E9
| 302539 ||  || — || July 9, 2002 || Socorro || LINEAR || RAF || align=right | 1.5 km || 
|-id=540 bgcolor=#E9E9E9
| 302540 ||  || — || July 14, 2002 || Palomar || NEAT || — || align=right | 1.4 km || 
|-id=541 bgcolor=#E9E9E9
| 302541 ||  || — || July 12, 2002 || Palomar || NEAT || — || align=right | 1.9 km || 
|-id=542 bgcolor=#E9E9E9
| 302542 Tilmann ||  ||  || July 5, 2002 || Palomar || M. Meyer || MIS || align=right | 2.1 km || 
|-id=543 bgcolor=#E9E9E9
| 302543 ||  || — || July 8, 2002 || Palomar || NEAT || — || align=right | 1.1 km || 
|-id=544 bgcolor=#E9E9E9
| 302544 ||  || — || July 9, 2002 || Palomar || NEAT || — || align=right | 1.7 km || 
|-id=545 bgcolor=#E9E9E9
| 302545 ||  || — || July 12, 2002 || Palomar || NEAT || BRG || align=right | 1.9 km || 
|-id=546 bgcolor=#E9E9E9
| 302546 ||  || — || July 15, 2002 || Palomar || NEAT || — || align=right | 1.2 km || 
|-id=547 bgcolor=#E9E9E9
| 302547 ||  || — || March 10, 2005 || Mount Lemmon || Mount Lemmon Survey || — || align=right | 1.9 km || 
|-id=548 bgcolor=#E9E9E9
| 302548 ||  || — || November 14, 2007 || Kitt Peak || Spacewatch || — || align=right | 1.3 km || 
|-id=549 bgcolor=#E9E9E9
| 302549 ||  || — || July 19, 2002 || Palomar || NEAT || — || align=right | 1.5 km || 
|-id=550 bgcolor=#E9E9E9
| 302550 ||  || — || July 18, 2002 || Socorro || LINEAR || EUN || align=right | 2.0 km || 
|-id=551 bgcolor=#E9E9E9
| 302551 ||  || — || July 20, 2002 || Palomar || NEAT || MAR || align=right | 1.8 km || 
|-id=552 bgcolor=#E9E9E9
| 302552 ||  || — || July 19, 2002 || Palomar || NEAT || — || align=right | 1.5 km || 
|-id=553 bgcolor=#E9E9E9
| 302553 ||  || — || July 20, 2002 || Palomar || NEAT || — || align=right | 1.5 km || 
|-id=554 bgcolor=#E9E9E9
| 302554 ||  || — || July 20, 2002 || Palomar || NEAT || — || align=right | 2.1 km || 
|-id=555 bgcolor=#E9E9E9
| 302555 ||  || — || July 29, 2002 || Palomar || NEAT || — || align=right | 1.4 km || 
|-id=556 bgcolor=#E9E9E9
| 302556 ||  || — || July 22, 2002 || Palomar || NEAT || — || align=right | 1.6 km || 
|-id=557 bgcolor=#E9E9E9
| 302557 ||  || — || July 16, 2002 || Palomar || NEAT || — || align=right | 2.4 km || 
|-id=558 bgcolor=#E9E9E9
| 302558 ||  || — || March 1, 2009 || Mount Lemmon || Mount Lemmon Survey || — || align=right | 2.2 km || 
|-id=559 bgcolor=#E9E9E9
| 302559 ||  || — || January 1, 2009 || Kitt Peak || Spacewatch || — || align=right | 1.9 km || 
|-id=560 bgcolor=#E9E9E9
| 302560 ||  || — || August 1, 2002 || Campo Imperatore || CINEOS || — || align=right | 1.2 km || 
|-id=561 bgcolor=#E9E9E9
| 302561 ||  || — || August 3, 2002 || Palomar || NEAT || — || align=right | 3.1 km || 
|-id=562 bgcolor=#E9E9E9
| 302562 ||  || — || August 6, 2002 || Palomar || NEAT || — || align=right | 1.7 km || 
|-id=563 bgcolor=#E9E9E9
| 302563 ||  || — || August 6, 2002 || Palomar || NEAT || — || align=right | 1.4 km || 
|-id=564 bgcolor=#E9E9E9
| 302564 ||  || — || August 6, 2002 || Palomar || NEAT || — || align=right | 1.4 km || 
|-id=565 bgcolor=#E9E9E9
| 302565 ||  || — || August 6, 2002 || Palomar || NEAT || MIS || align=right | 3.1 km || 
|-id=566 bgcolor=#E9E9E9
| 302566 ||  || — || August 6, 2002 || Palomar || NEAT || JUN || align=right | 1.1 km || 
|-id=567 bgcolor=#E9E9E9
| 302567 ||  || — || August 8, 2002 || Palomar || NEAT || — || align=right | 1.2 km || 
|-id=568 bgcolor=#E9E9E9
| 302568 ||  || — || August 9, 2002 || Socorro || LINEAR || JUN || align=right | 1.5 km || 
|-id=569 bgcolor=#E9E9E9
| 302569 ||  || — || August 12, 2002 || Socorro || LINEAR || — || align=right | 3.3 km || 
|-id=570 bgcolor=#E9E9E9
| 302570 ||  || — || August 12, 2002 || Socorro || LINEAR || — || align=right | 1.4 km || 
|-id=571 bgcolor=#E9E9E9
| 302571 ||  || — || August 12, 2002 || Socorro || LINEAR || JUN || align=right | 1.3 km || 
|-id=572 bgcolor=#E9E9E9
| 302572 ||  || — || August 11, 2002 || Palomar || NEAT || — || align=right | 2.1 km || 
|-id=573 bgcolor=#E9E9E9
| 302573 ||  || — || August 10, 2002 || Socorro || LINEAR || EUN || align=right | 1.7 km || 
|-id=574 bgcolor=#E9E9E9
| 302574 ||  || — || August 13, 2002 || Socorro || LINEAR || — || align=right | 3.1 km || 
|-id=575 bgcolor=#E9E9E9
| 302575 ||  || — || August 12, 2002 || Socorro || LINEAR || — || align=right | 1.8 km || 
|-id=576 bgcolor=#E9E9E9
| 302576 ||  || — || August 12, 2002 || Socorro || LINEAR || ADE || align=right | 2.8 km || 
|-id=577 bgcolor=#E9E9E9
| 302577 ||  || — || August 13, 2002 || Socorro || LINEAR || — || align=right | 1.4 km || 
|-id=578 bgcolor=#FA8072
| 302578 ||  || — || August 13, 2002 || Socorro || LINEAR || — || align=right | 2.1 km || 
|-id=579 bgcolor=#E9E9E9
| 302579 ||  || — || August 13, 2002 || Socorro || LINEAR || ADE || align=right | 3.0 km || 
|-id=580 bgcolor=#E9E9E9
| 302580 ||  || — || August 14, 2002 || Socorro || LINEAR || — || align=right | 2.2 km || 
|-id=581 bgcolor=#E9E9E9
| 302581 ||  || — || August 8, 2002 || Palomar || S. F. Hönig || — || align=right | 1.6 km || 
|-id=582 bgcolor=#E9E9E9
| 302582 ||  || — || August 15, 2002 || Palomar || NEAT || — || align=right | 1.1 km || 
|-id=583 bgcolor=#E9E9E9
| 302583 ||  || — || August 8, 2002 || Palomar || NEAT || — || align=right | 1.5 km || 
|-id=584 bgcolor=#E9E9E9
| 302584 ||  || — || August 15, 2002 || Palomar || NEAT || — || align=right | 1.8 km || 
|-id=585 bgcolor=#E9E9E9
| 302585 ||  || — || August 7, 2002 || Palomar || NEAT || — || align=right | 1.5 km || 
|-id=586 bgcolor=#E9E9E9
| 302586 ||  || — || January 3, 2009 || Mount Lemmon || Mount Lemmon Survey || — || align=right | 1.2 km || 
|-id=587 bgcolor=#E9E9E9
| 302587 ||  || — || August 7, 2002 || Palomar || NEAT || — || align=right | 1.4 km || 
|-id=588 bgcolor=#E9E9E9
| 302588 ||  || — || December 19, 2007 || Kitt Peak || Spacewatch || — || align=right | 1.5 km || 
|-id=589 bgcolor=#E9E9E9
| 302589 ||  || — || November 2, 2007 || Kitt Peak || Spacewatch || — || align=right | 2.9 km || 
|-id=590 bgcolor=#E9E9E9
| 302590 ||  || — || August 16, 2002 || Palomar || NEAT || — || align=right | 1.9 km || 
|-id=591 bgcolor=#FFC2E0
| 302591 ||  || — || August 18, 2002 || Socorro || LINEAR || AMO || align=right data-sort-value="0.42" | 420 m || 
|-id=592 bgcolor=#E9E9E9
| 302592 ||  || — || August 26, 2002 || Palomar || NEAT || JNS || align=right | 2.3 km || 
|-id=593 bgcolor=#E9E9E9
| 302593 ||  || — || August 26, 2002 || Palomar || NEAT || — || align=right | 2.0 km || 
|-id=594 bgcolor=#E9E9E9
| 302594 ||  || — || August 29, 2002 || Kitt Peak || Spacewatch || — || align=right | 1.6 km || 
|-id=595 bgcolor=#E9E9E9
| 302595 ||  || — || August 29, 2002 || Palomar || S. F. Hönig || — || align=right | 1.5 km || 
|-id=596 bgcolor=#E9E9E9
| 302596 ||  || — || August 28, 2002 || Palomar || NEAT || — || align=right | 1.9 km || 
|-id=597 bgcolor=#E9E9E9
| 302597 ||  || — || August 26, 2002 || Palomar || NEAT || — || align=right | 1.4 km || 
|-id=598 bgcolor=#E9E9E9
| 302598 ||  || — || August 17, 2002 || Palomar || NEAT || — || align=right | 1.4 km || 
|-id=599 bgcolor=#E9E9E9
| 302599 ||  || — || August 27, 2002 || Palomar || NEAT || — || align=right | 1.6 km || 
|-id=600 bgcolor=#E9E9E9
| 302600 ||  || — || August 28, 2002 || Palomar || NEAT || — || align=right | 1.6 km || 
|}

302601–302700 

|-bgcolor=#E9E9E9
| 302601 ||  || — || August 16, 2002 || Palomar || NEAT || ADE || align=right | 2.3 km || 
|-id=602 bgcolor=#E9E9E9
| 302602 ||  || — || August 27, 2002 || Palomar || NEAT || ADE || align=right | 1.8 km || 
|-id=603 bgcolor=#E9E9E9
| 302603 ||  || — || August 17, 2002 || Palomar || NEAT || — || align=right | 1.8 km || 
|-id=604 bgcolor=#E9E9E9
| 302604 ||  || — || August 16, 2002 || Palomar || NEAT || ADE || align=right | 1.6 km || 
|-id=605 bgcolor=#E9E9E9
| 302605 ||  || — || August 19, 2002 || Palomar || NEAT || ADE || align=right | 2.5 km || 
|-id=606 bgcolor=#E9E9E9
| 302606 ||  || — || August 30, 2002 || Palomar || NEAT || — || align=right | 1.6 km || 
|-id=607 bgcolor=#E9E9E9
| 302607 ||  || — || August 27, 2002 || Palomar || NEAT || — || align=right | 1.2 km || 
|-id=608 bgcolor=#E9E9E9
| 302608 ||  || — || August 29, 2002 || Palomar || NEAT || — || align=right | 1.5 km || 
|-id=609 bgcolor=#E9E9E9
| 302609 ||  || — || August 19, 2002 || Palomar || NEAT || WIT || align=right | 1.3 km || 
|-id=610 bgcolor=#E9E9E9
| 302610 ||  || — || August 18, 2002 || Palomar || NEAT || — || align=right | 1.3 km || 
|-id=611 bgcolor=#E9E9E9
| 302611 ||  || — || August 26, 2002 || Palomar || NEAT || — || align=right | 1.8 km || 
|-id=612 bgcolor=#E9E9E9
| 302612 ||  || — || August 18, 2002 || Palomar || NEAT || — || align=right | 1.4 km || 
|-id=613 bgcolor=#E9E9E9
| 302613 ||  || — || August 16, 2002 || Palomar || NEAT || — || align=right | 1.9 km || 
|-id=614 bgcolor=#E9E9E9
| 302614 ||  || — || August 29, 2002 || Palomar || NEAT || — || align=right | 1.5 km || 
|-id=615 bgcolor=#E9E9E9
| 302615 ||  || — || August 28, 2002 || Palomar || NEAT || — || align=right data-sort-value="0.99" | 990 m || 
|-id=616 bgcolor=#E9E9E9
| 302616 ||  || — || August 20, 2002 || Palomar || NEAT || — || align=right | 1.9 km || 
|-id=617 bgcolor=#E9E9E9
| 302617 ||  || — || August 30, 2002 || Palomar || NEAT || — || align=right | 1.5 km || 
|-id=618 bgcolor=#E9E9E9
| 302618 ||  || — || August 30, 2002 || Palomar || NEAT || — || align=right | 1.7 km || 
|-id=619 bgcolor=#E9E9E9
| 302619 ||  || — || April 15, 2001 || Kitt Peak || Spacewatch || — || align=right | 2.8 km || 
|-id=620 bgcolor=#E9E9E9
| 302620 ||  || — || August 29, 2002 || Palomar || NEAT || — || align=right | 1.3 km || 
|-id=621 bgcolor=#E9E9E9
| 302621 ||  || — || August 17, 2002 || Palomar || NEAT || — || align=right | 1.4 km || 
|-id=622 bgcolor=#E9E9E9
| 302622 ||  || — || August 17, 2002 || Palomar || NEAT || — || align=right | 1.2 km || 
|-id=623 bgcolor=#E9E9E9
| 302623 ||  || — || August 17, 2002 || Palomar || NEAT || — || align=right | 1.3 km || 
|-id=624 bgcolor=#E9E9E9
| 302624 ||  || — || August 9, 1994 || La Silla || A. T. Hansen || — || align=right | 1.2 km || 
|-id=625 bgcolor=#E9E9E9
| 302625 ||  || — || September 4, 2002 || Emerald Lane || L. Ball || — || align=right | 1.6 km || 
|-id=626 bgcolor=#E9E9E9
| 302626 ||  || — || September 3, 2002 || Palomar || NEAT || AER || align=right | 1.5 km || 
|-id=627 bgcolor=#E9E9E9
| 302627 ||  || — || September 4, 2002 || Palomar || NEAT || — || align=right | 2.1 km || 
|-id=628 bgcolor=#E9E9E9
| 302628 ||  || — || September 4, 2002 || Anderson Mesa || LONEOS || — || align=right | 2.4 km || 
|-id=629 bgcolor=#E9E9E9
| 302629 ||  || — || September 5, 2002 || Anderson Mesa || LONEOS || — || align=right | 2.0 km || 
|-id=630 bgcolor=#E9E9E9
| 302630 ||  || — || September 5, 2002 || Socorro || LINEAR || — || align=right | 2.2 km || 
|-id=631 bgcolor=#E9E9E9
| 302631 ||  || — || September 5, 2002 || Socorro || LINEAR || — || align=right | 2.1 km || 
|-id=632 bgcolor=#E9E9E9
| 302632 ||  || — || September 5, 2002 || Socorro || LINEAR || — || align=right | 1.9 km || 
|-id=633 bgcolor=#E9E9E9
| 302633 ||  || — || September 5, 2002 || Anderson Mesa || LONEOS || ADE || align=right | 2.3 km || 
|-id=634 bgcolor=#E9E9E9
| 302634 ||  || — || September 10, 2002 || Palomar || NEAT || ADE || align=right | 3.2 km || 
|-id=635 bgcolor=#E9E9E9
| 302635 ||  || — || September 10, 2002 || Palomar || NEAT || — || align=right | 3.3 km || 
|-id=636 bgcolor=#E9E9E9
| 302636 ||  || — || September 10, 2002 || Palomar || NEAT || — || align=right | 2.0 km || 
|-id=637 bgcolor=#E9E9E9
| 302637 ||  || — || September 10, 2002 || Palomar || NEAT || MAR || align=right | 1.4 km || 
|-id=638 bgcolor=#E9E9E9
| 302638 ||  || — || September 11, 2002 || Palomar || NEAT || — || align=right | 2.2 km || 
|-id=639 bgcolor=#E9E9E9
| 302639 ||  || — || September 11, 2002 || Palomar || NEAT || — || align=right | 2.0 km || 
|-id=640 bgcolor=#E9E9E9
| 302640 ||  || — || September 11, 2002 || Palomar || NEAT || — || align=right | 1.9 km || 
|-id=641 bgcolor=#E9E9E9
| 302641 ||  || — || September 11, 2002 || Palomar || NEAT || — || align=right | 1.3 km || 
|-id=642 bgcolor=#E9E9E9
| 302642 ||  || — || September 11, 2002 || Palomar || NEAT || EUN || align=right | 2.1 km || 
|-id=643 bgcolor=#E9E9E9
| 302643 ||  || — || September 11, 2002 || Palomar || NEAT || — || align=right | 2.7 km || 
|-id=644 bgcolor=#E9E9E9
| 302644 ||  || — || September 12, 2002 || Palomar || NEAT || — || align=right | 1.1 km || 
|-id=645 bgcolor=#E9E9E9
| 302645 ||  || — || September 15, 2002 || Haleakala || NEAT || — || align=right | 4.1 km || 
|-id=646 bgcolor=#E9E9E9
| 302646 ||  || — || September 14, 2002 || Palomar || NEAT || HNS || align=right | 1.9 km || 
|-id=647 bgcolor=#E9E9E9
| 302647 ||  || — || September 14, 2002 || Haleakala || NEAT || HNS || align=right | 1.9 km || 
|-id=648 bgcolor=#E9E9E9
| 302648 ||  || — || September 12, 2002 || Palomar || R. Matson || — || align=right | 1.3 km || 
|-id=649 bgcolor=#E9E9E9
| 302649 ||  || — || September 15, 2002 || Palomar || R. Matson || — || align=right | 1.8 km || 
|-id=650 bgcolor=#E9E9E9
| 302650 ||  || — || September 4, 2002 || Palomar || S. F. Hönig || — || align=right | 1.6 km || 
|-id=651 bgcolor=#E9E9E9
| 302651 ||  || — || September 14, 2002 || Palomar || R. Matson || — || align=right | 1.3 km || 
|-id=652 bgcolor=#E9E9E9
| 302652 Hauke ||  ||  || September 10, 2002 || Palomar || M. Meyer || — || align=right | 2.6 km || 
|-id=653 bgcolor=#E9E9E9
| 302653 ||  || — || September 14, 2002 || Palomar || NEAT || — || align=right | 1.7 km || 
|-id=654 bgcolor=#E9E9E9
| 302654 ||  || — || September 4, 2002 || Palomar || NEAT || — || align=right | 1.8 km || 
|-id=655 bgcolor=#E9E9E9
| 302655 ||  || — || September 14, 2002 || Palomar || NEAT || — || align=right | 1.5 km || 
|-id=656 bgcolor=#E9E9E9
| 302656 ||  || — || September 8, 2002 || Haleakala || NEAT || — || align=right | 1.7 km || 
|-id=657 bgcolor=#E9E9E9
| 302657 ||  || — || September 12, 2002 || Palomar || NEAT || — || align=right | 1.7 km || 
|-id=658 bgcolor=#E9E9E9
| 302658 ||  || — || September 14, 2002 || Palomar || NEAT || HEN || align=right | 1.0 km || 
|-id=659 bgcolor=#E9E9E9
| 302659 ||  || — || September 14, 2002 || Palomar || NEAT || — || align=right | 1.5 km || 
|-id=660 bgcolor=#E9E9E9
| 302660 ||  || — || September 13, 2002 || Palomar || NEAT || — || align=right | 3.0 km || 
|-id=661 bgcolor=#E9E9E9
| 302661 ||  || — || September 26, 2002 || Palomar || NEAT || — || align=right | 1.9 km || 
|-id=662 bgcolor=#E9E9E9
| 302662 ||  || — || September 27, 2002 || Palomar || NEAT || — || align=right | 1.9 km || 
|-id=663 bgcolor=#E9E9E9
| 302663 ||  || — || September 27, 2002 || Palomar || NEAT || WIT || align=right | 1.4 km || 
|-id=664 bgcolor=#E9E9E9
| 302664 ||  || — || September 27, 2002 || Palomar || NEAT || — || align=right | 2.9 km || 
|-id=665 bgcolor=#E9E9E9
| 302665 ||  || — || September 26, 2002 || Palomar || NEAT || EUN || align=right | 1.5 km || 
|-id=666 bgcolor=#E9E9E9
| 302666 ||  || — || September 28, 2002 || Haleakala || NEAT || GEF || align=right | 1.8 km || 
|-id=667 bgcolor=#E9E9E9
| 302667 ||  || — || September 30, 2002 || Socorro || LINEAR || — || align=right | 1.9 km || 
|-id=668 bgcolor=#E9E9E9
| 302668 ||  || — || September 28, 2002 || Palomar || NEAT || — || align=right | 1.9 km || 
|-id=669 bgcolor=#E9E9E9
| 302669 ||  || — || September 30, 2002 || Socorro || LINEAR || HNS || align=right | 1.7 km || 
|-id=670 bgcolor=#E9E9E9
| 302670 ||  || — || September 30, 2002 || Socorro || LINEAR || MAR || align=right | 1.8 km || 
|-id=671 bgcolor=#E9E9E9
| 302671 ||  || — || September 30, 2002 || Haleakala || NEAT || — || align=right | 3.5 km || 
|-id=672 bgcolor=#E9E9E9
| 302672 ||  || — || September 17, 2002 || Palomar || NEAT || WIT || align=right | 1.5 km || 
|-id=673 bgcolor=#E9E9E9
| 302673 ||  || — || March 9, 2005 || Mount Lemmon || Mount Lemmon Survey || — || align=right | 2.2 km || 
|-id=674 bgcolor=#E9E9E9
| 302674 ||  || — || September 26, 2002 || Palomar || NEAT || WIT || align=right data-sort-value="0.97" | 970 m || 
|-id=675 bgcolor=#E9E9E9
| 302675 ||  || — || September 17, 2002 || Palomar || NEAT || — || align=right | 2.6 km || 
|-id=676 bgcolor=#E9E9E9
| 302676 ||  || — || September 26, 2002 || Palomar || NEAT || — || align=right | 2.2 km || 
|-id=677 bgcolor=#E9E9E9
| 302677 ||  || — || September 18, 2002 || Campo Imperatore || CINEOS || — || align=right | 2.5 km || 
|-id=678 bgcolor=#E9E9E9
| 302678 ||  || — || November 7, 2007 || Kitt Peak || Spacewatch || — || align=right | 1.4 km || 
|-id=679 bgcolor=#E9E9E9
| 302679 ||  || — || October 1, 2002 || Anderson Mesa || LONEOS || — || align=right | 2.7 km || 
|-id=680 bgcolor=#E9E9E9
| 302680 ||  || — || October 1, 2002 || Anderson Mesa || LONEOS || — || align=right | 3.0 km || 
|-id=681 bgcolor=#E9E9E9
| 302681 ||  || — || October 2, 2002 || Socorro || LINEAR || — || align=right | 3.0 km || 
|-id=682 bgcolor=#E9E9E9
| 302682 ||  || — || October 2, 2002 || Socorro || LINEAR || — || align=right | 3.8 km || 
|-id=683 bgcolor=#E9E9E9
| 302683 ||  || — || October 2, 2002 || Socorro || LINEAR || — || align=right | 2.8 km || 
|-id=684 bgcolor=#E9E9E9
| 302684 ||  || — || October 2, 2002 || Socorro || LINEAR || — || align=right | 1.8 km || 
|-id=685 bgcolor=#E9E9E9
| 302685 ||  || — || October 2, 2002 || Haleakala || NEAT || — || align=right | 2.2 km || 
|-id=686 bgcolor=#E9E9E9
| 302686 ||  || — || October 3, 2002 || Campo Imperatore || CINEOS || EUN || align=right | 1.7 km || 
|-id=687 bgcolor=#E9E9E9
| 302687 ||  || — || October 3, 2002 || Campo Imperatore || CINEOS || — || align=right | 3.4 km || 
|-id=688 bgcolor=#E9E9E9
| 302688 ||  || — || October 7, 2002 || Socorro || LINEAR || GER || align=right | 3.8 km || 
|-id=689 bgcolor=#E9E9E9
| 302689 ||  || — || October 2, 2002 || Campo Imperatore || CINEOS || — || align=right | 2.4 km || 
|-id=690 bgcolor=#E9E9E9
| 302690 ||  || — || October 1, 2002 || Anderson Mesa || LONEOS || — || align=right | 2.0 km || 
|-id=691 bgcolor=#E9E9E9
| 302691 ||  || — || October 1, 2002 || Anderson Mesa || LONEOS || — || align=right | 2.3 km || 
|-id=692 bgcolor=#E9E9E9
| 302692 ||  || — || October 1, 2002 || Haleakala || NEAT || — || align=right | 2.3 km || 
|-id=693 bgcolor=#E9E9E9
| 302693 ||  || — || October 4, 2002 || Anderson Mesa || LONEOS || JUN || align=right | 1.4 km || 
|-id=694 bgcolor=#E9E9E9
| 302694 ||  || — || October 4, 2002 || Socorro || LINEAR || — || align=right | 1.9 km || 
|-id=695 bgcolor=#E9E9E9
| 302695 ||  || — || October 3, 2002 || Palomar || NEAT || — || align=right | 2.5 km || 
|-id=696 bgcolor=#E9E9E9
| 302696 ||  || — || October 3, 2002 || Palomar || NEAT || — || align=right | 2.5 km || 
|-id=697 bgcolor=#E9E9E9
| 302697 ||  || — || October 3, 2002 || Palomar || NEAT || — || align=right | 3.9 km || 
|-id=698 bgcolor=#E9E9E9
| 302698 ||  || — || October 3, 2002 || Palomar || NEAT || — || align=right | 2.0 km || 
|-id=699 bgcolor=#E9E9E9
| 302699 ||  || — || October 4, 2002 || Socorro || LINEAR || — || align=right | 2.7 km || 
|-id=700 bgcolor=#E9E9E9
| 302700 ||  || — || September 14, 2002 || Palomar || NEAT || — || align=right | 1.4 km || 
|}

302701–302800 

|-bgcolor=#E9E9E9
| 302701 ||  || — || October 5, 2002 || Palomar || NEAT || — || align=right | 3.3 km || 
|-id=702 bgcolor=#E9E9E9
| 302702 ||  || — || October 3, 2002 || Socorro || LINEAR || — || align=right | 2.0 km || 
|-id=703 bgcolor=#E9E9E9
| 302703 ||  || — || October 3, 2002 || Palomar || NEAT || EUN || align=right | 1.8 km || 
|-id=704 bgcolor=#E9E9E9
| 302704 ||  || — || October 4, 2002 || Palomar || NEAT || — || align=right | 2.1 km || 
|-id=705 bgcolor=#E9E9E9
| 302705 ||  || — || October 4, 2002 || Anderson Mesa || LONEOS || EUN || align=right | 2.0 km || 
|-id=706 bgcolor=#E9E9E9
| 302706 ||  || — || October 5, 2002 || Palomar || NEAT || — || align=right | 3.6 km || 
|-id=707 bgcolor=#E9E9E9
| 302707 ||  || — || October 3, 2002 || Palomar || NEAT || — || align=right | 3.2 km || 
|-id=708 bgcolor=#E9E9E9
| 302708 ||  || — || October 5, 2002 || Anderson Mesa || LONEOS || JUN || align=right | 1.5 km || 
|-id=709 bgcolor=#E9E9E9
| 302709 ||  || — || October 5, 2002 || Socorro || LINEAR || — || align=right | 3.3 km || 
|-id=710 bgcolor=#E9E9E9
| 302710 ||  || — || October 6, 2002 || Haleakala || NEAT || GEF || align=right | 1.6 km || 
|-id=711 bgcolor=#E9E9E9
| 302711 ||  || — || October 6, 2002 || Socorro || LINEAR || — || align=right | 2.4 km || 
|-id=712 bgcolor=#E9E9E9
| 302712 ||  || — || October 7, 2002 || Palomar || NEAT || — || align=right | 2.6 km || 
|-id=713 bgcolor=#E9E9E9
| 302713 ||  || — || October 6, 2002 || Socorro || LINEAR || — || align=right | 2.5 km || 
|-id=714 bgcolor=#E9E9E9
| 302714 ||  || — || October 6, 2002 || Socorro || LINEAR || — || align=right | 3.0 km || 
|-id=715 bgcolor=#E9E9E9
| 302715 ||  || — || October 7, 2002 || Socorro || LINEAR || MRX || align=right | 1.5 km || 
|-id=716 bgcolor=#E9E9E9
| 302716 ||  || — || October 9, 2002 || Socorro || LINEAR || — || align=right | 3.0 km || 
|-id=717 bgcolor=#E9E9E9
| 302717 ||  || — || October 9, 2002 || Socorro || LINEAR || — || align=right | 2.7 km || 
|-id=718 bgcolor=#E9E9E9
| 302718 ||  || — || October 10, 2002 || Socorro || LINEAR || — || align=right | 2.7 km || 
|-id=719 bgcolor=#E9E9E9
| 302719 ||  || — || October 10, 2002 || Socorro || LINEAR || — || align=right | 4.0 km || 
|-id=720 bgcolor=#E9E9E9
| 302720 ||  || — || October 11, 2002 || Socorro || LINEAR || — || align=right | 1.9 km || 
|-id=721 bgcolor=#E9E9E9
| 302721 ||  || — || October 12, 2002 || Socorro || LINEAR || — || align=right | 2.7 km || 
|-id=722 bgcolor=#E9E9E9
| 302722 ||  || — || October 12, 2002 || Socorro || LINEAR || — || align=right | 2.1 km || 
|-id=723 bgcolor=#E9E9E9
| 302723 ||  || — || October 15, 2002 || Palomar || NEAT || — || align=right | 1.9 km || 
|-id=724 bgcolor=#E9E9E9
| 302724 ||  || — || October 4, 2002 || Apache Point || SDSS || GEF || align=right | 1.3 km || 
|-id=725 bgcolor=#E9E9E9
| 302725 ||  || — || October 4, 2002 || Apache Point || SDSS || — || align=right | 2.9 km || 
|-id=726 bgcolor=#E9E9E9
| 302726 ||  || — || October 4, 2002 || Apache Point || SDSS || — || align=right | 3.3 km || 
|-id=727 bgcolor=#E9E9E9
| 302727 ||  || — || October 5, 2002 || Apache Point || SDSS || CLO || align=right | 2.3 km || 
|-id=728 bgcolor=#E9E9E9
| 302728 ||  || — || October 5, 2002 || Apache Point || SDSS || WIT || align=right | 1.1 km || 
|-id=729 bgcolor=#E9E9E9
| 302729 ||  || — || October 5, 2002 || Apache Point || SDSS || — || align=right | 2.4 km || 
|-id=730 bgcolor=#E9E9E9
| 302730 ||  || — || October 5, 2002 || Apache Point || SDSS || — || align=right | 2.4 km || 
|-id=731 bgcolor=#E9E9E9
| 302731 ||  || — || October 10, 2002 || Apache Point || SDSS || — || align=right | 2.1 km || 
|-id=732 bgcolor=#E9E9E9
| 302732 ||  || — || October 1, 2002 || Haleakala || NEAT || — || align=right | 2.2 km || 
|-id=733 bgcolor=#E9E9E9
| 302733 ||  || — || October 15, 2002 || Palomar || NEAT || — || align=right | 1.9 km || 
|-id=734 bgcolor=#E9E9E9
| 302734 ||  || — || October 6, 2002 || Palomar || NEAT || — || align=right | 1.6 km || 
|-id=735 bgcolor=#E9E9E9
| 302735 ||  || — || October 11, 2002 || Palomar || NEAT || MRX || align=right | 1.3 km || 
|-id=736 bgcolor=#E9E9E9
| 302736 ||  || — || October 15, 2002 || Palomar || NEAT || — || align=right | 2.1 km || 
|-id=737 bgcolor=#E9E9E9
| 302737 ||  || — || June 6, 2010 || Kitt Peak || Spacewatch || 526 || align=right | 2.4 km || 
|-id=738 bgcolor=#E9E9E9
| 302738 ||  || — || October 29, 2002 || Palomar || NEAT || — || align=right | 1.7 km || 
|-id=739 bgcolor=#E9E9E9
| 302739 ||  || — || October 28, 2002 || Palomar || NEAT || — || align=right | 2.1 km || 
|-id=740 bgcolor=#E9E9E9
| 302740 ||  || — || October 30, 2002 || Palomar || NEAT || — || align=right | 2.7 km || 
|-id=741 bgcolor=#E9E9E9
| 302741 ||  || — || October 30, 2002 || Palomar || NEAT || — || align=right | 2.8 km || 
|-id=742 bgcolor=#E9E9E9
| 302742 ||  || — || October 31, 2002 || Palomar || NEAT || — || align=right | 2.4 km || 
|-id=743 bgcolor=#E9E9E9
| 302743 ||  || — || October 30, 2002 || Palomar || NEAT || — || align=right | 2.5 km || 
|-id=744 bgcolor=#E9E9E9
| 302744 ||  || — || October 30, 2002 || Palomar || NEAT || — || align=right | 2.4 km || 
|-id=745 bgcolor=#E9E9E9
| 302745 ||  || — || October 31, 2002 || Kitt Peak || Spacewatch || — || align=right | 1.9 km || 
|-id=746 bgcolor=#E9E9E9
| 302746 ||  || — || October 30, 2002 || Palomar || S. F. Hönig || DOR || align=right | 2.4 km || 
|-id=747 bgcolor=#E9E9E9
| 302747 ||  || — || October 29, 2002 || Apache Point || SDSS || — || align=right | 2.2 km || 
|-id=748 bgcolor=#E9E9E9
| 302748 ||  || — || October 30, 2002 || Apache Point || SDSS || NEM || align=right | 2.0 km || 
|-id=749 bgcolor=#E9E9E9
| 302749 ||  || — || October 30, 2002 || Apache Point || SDSS || — || align=right | 1.9 km || 
|-id=750 bgcolor=#E9E9E9
| 302750 ||  || — || October 31, 2002 || Palomar || NEAT || AEO || align=right | 1.2 km || 
|-id=751 bgcolor=#E9E9E9
| 302751 ||  || — || November 1, 2002 || Palomar || NEAT || — || align=right | 2.8 km || 
|-id=752 bgcolor=#E9E9E9
| 302752 ||  || — || November 6, 2002 || Needville || Needville Obs. || — || align=right | 2.8 km || 
|-id=753 bgcolor=#E9E9E9
| 302753 ||  || — || November 4, 2002 || Kitt Peak || Spacewatch || — || align=right | 2.6 km || 
|-id=754 bgcolor=#E9E9E9
| 302754 ||  || — || November 5, 2002 || Socorro || LINEAR || — || align=right | 2.7 km || 
|-id=755 bgcolor=#E9E9E9
| 302755 ||  || — || November 5, 2002 || Socorro || LINEAR || — || align=right | 3.6 km || 
|-id=756 bgcolor=#E9E9E9
| 302756 ||  || — || November 5, 2002 || Anderson Mesa || LONEOS || — || align=right | 3.5 km || 
|-id=757 bgcolor=#E9E9E9
| 302757 ||  || — || November 5, 2002 || Socorro || LINEAR || — || align=right | 2.9 km || 
|-id=758 bgcolor=#E9E9E9
| 302758 ||  || — || November 4, 2002 || Palomar || NEAT || — || align=right | 2.8 km || 
|-id=759 bgcolor=#E9E9E9
| 302759 ||  || — || November 6, 2002 || Socorro || LINEAR || — || align=right | 3.7 km || 
|-id=760 bgcolor=#E9E9E9
| 302760 ||  || — || November 6, 2002 || Anderson Mesa || LONEOS || — || align=right | 4.4 km || 
|-id=761 bgcolor=#E9E9E9
| 302761 ||  || — || November 7, 2002 || Socorro || LINEAR || — || align=right | 2.9 km || 
|-id=762 bgcolor=#E9E9E9
| 302762 ||  || — || November 11, 2002 || Anderson Mesa || LONEOS || — || align=right | 3.6 km || 
|-id=763 bgcolor=#E9E9E9
| 302763 ||  || — || November 12, 2002 || Socorro || LINEAR || — || align=right | 2.6 km || 
|-id=764 bgcolor=#E9E9E9
| 302764 ||  || — || November 13, 2002 || Socorro || LINEAR || — || align=right | 3.6 km || 
|-id=765 bgcolor=#E9E9E9
| 302765 ||  || — || November 12, 2002 || Socorro || LINEAR || — || align=right | 3.0 km || 
|-id=766 bgcolor=#E9E9E9
| 302766 ||  || — || November 12, 2002 || Socorro || LINEAR || 526 || align=right | 3.9 km || 
|-id=767 bgcolor=#E9E9E9
| 302767 ||  || — || November 12, 2002 || Socorro || LINEAR || — || align=right | 3.1 km || 
|-id=768 bgcolor=#E9E9E9
| 302768 ||  || — || November 13, 2002 || Palomar || NEAT || — || align=right | 2.7 km || 
|-id=769 bgcolor=#E9E9E9
| 302769 ||  || — || November 13, 2002 || Palomar || NEAT || — || align=right | 3.1 km || 
|-id=770 bgcolor=#E9E9E9
| 302770 ||  || — || November 14, 2002 || Palomar || NEAT || — || align=right | 3.7 km || 
|-id=771 bgcolor=#E9E9E9
| 302771 ||  || — || November 5, 2002 || Socorro || LINEAR || — || align=right | 2.4 km || 
|-id=772 bgcolor=#E9E9E9
| 302772 ||  || — || November 7, 2002 || Socorro || LINEAR || — || align=right | 2.6 km || 
|-id=773 bgcolor=#E9E9E9
| 302773 ||  || — || November 7, 2002 || Kitt Peak || Spacewatch || — || align=right | 2.6 km || 
|-id=774 bgcolor=#E9E9E9
| 302774 ||  || — || November 4, 2002 || Palomar || NEAT || — || align=right | 2.4 km || 
|-id=775 bgcolor=#E9E9E9
| 302775 ||  || — || November 14, 2002 || Palomar || NEAT || — || align=right | 1.8 km || 
|-id=776 bgcolor=#E9E9E9
| 302776 ||  || — || November 24, 2002 || Palomar || NEAT || — || align=right | 3.0 km || 
|-id=777 bgcolor=#E9E9E9
| 302777 ||  || — || November 24, 2002 || Palomar || NEAT || — || align=right | 3.4 km || 
|-id=778 bgcolor=#E9E9E9
| 302778 ||  || — || November 24, 2002 || Palomar || NEAT || — || align=right | 3.2 km || 
|-id=779 bgcolor=#d6d6d6
| 302779 ||  || — || November 16, 2002 || Palomar || NEAT || KAR || align=right | 1.3 km || 
|-id=780 bgcolor=#E9E9E9
| 302780 ||  || — || November 22, 2002 || Palomar || NEAT || WIT || align=right | 1.5 km || 
|-id=781 bgcolor=#E9E9E9
| 302781 ||  || — || December 3, 2002 || Haleakala || NEAT || — || align=right | 2.5 km || 
|-id=782 bgcolor=#E9E9E9
| 302782 ||  || — || December 2, 2002 || Socorro || LINEAR || — || align=right | 3.1 km || 
|-id=783 bgcolor=#E9E9E9
| 302783 ||  || — || December 2, 2002 || Socorro || LINEAR || — || align=right | 3.2 km || 
|-id=784 bgcolor=#E9E9E9
| 302784 ||  || — || December 6, 2002 || Socorro || LINEAR || — || align=right | 4.1 km || 
|-id=785 bgcolor=#FA8072
| 302785 ||  || — || December 11, 2002 || Socorro || LINEAR || — || align=right | 2.6 km || 
|-id=786 bgcolor=#E9E9E9
| 302786 ||  || — || December 10, 2002 || Socorro || LINEAR || — || align=right | 2.8 km || 
|-id=787 bgcolor=#E9E9E9
| 302787 ||  || — || December 7, 2002 || Socorro || LINEAR || — || align=right | 2.8 km || 
|-id=788 bgcolor=#E9E9E9
| 302788 ||  || — || December 10, 2002 || Socorro || LINEAR || — || align=right | 2.8 km || 
|-id=789 bgcolor=#E9E9E9
| 302789 ||  || — || December 10, 2002 || Palomar || NEAT || — || align=right | 2.8 km || 
|-id=790 bgcolor=#E9E9E9
| 302790 ||  || — || December 11, 2002 || Socorro || LINEAR || — || align=right | 3.4 km || 
|-id=791 bgcolor=#d6d6d6
| 302791 ||  || — || December 11, 2002 || Socorro || LINEAR || — || align=right | 2.5 km || 
|-id=792 bgcolor=#E9E9E9
| 302792 ||  || — || December 12, 2002 || Socorro || LINEAR || — || align=right | 3.1 km || 
|-id=793 bgcolor=#E9E9E9
| 302793 ||  || — || December 5, 2002 || Socorro || LINEAR || — || align=right | 4.0 km || 
|-id=794 bgcolor=#d6d6d6
| 302794 ||  || — || December 5, 2002 || Socorro || LINEAR || BRA || align=right | 2.3 km || 
|-id=795 bgcolor=#E9E9E9
| 302795 ||  || — || December 5, 2002 || Socorro || LINEAR || — || align=right | 4.4 km || 
|-id=796 bgcolor=#E9E9E9
| 302796 ||  || — || December 1, 2002 || Socorro || LINEAR || DOR || align=right | 3.1 km || 
|-id=797 bgcolor=#E9E9E9
| 302797 ||  || — || December 3, 2002 || Palomar || NEAT || — || align=right | 2.4 km || 
|-id=798 bgcolor=#E9E9E9
| 302798 ||  || — || December 31, 2002 || Socorro || LINEAR || — || align=right | 2.8 km || 
|-id=799 bgcolor=#E9E9E9
| 302799 ||  || — || December 27, 2002 || Palomar || NEAT || — || align=right | 3.3 km || 
|-id=800 bgcolor=#FFC2E0
| 302800 ||  || — || January 1, 2003 || Socorro || LINEAR || AMO || align=right data-sort-value="0.47" | 470 m || 
|}

302801–302900 

|-bgcolor=#E9E9E9
| 302801 ||  || — || January 1, 2003 || Socorro || LINEAR || JUN || align=right | 1.6 km || 
|-id=802 bgcolor=#d6d6d6
| 302802 ||  || — || January 5, 2003 || Anderson Mesa || LONEOS || — || align=right | 3.5 km || 
|-id=803 bgcolor=#d6d6d6
| 302803 ||  || — || January 4, 2003 || Socorro || LINEAR || — || align=right | 3.5 km || 
|-id=804 bgcolor=#d6d6d6
| 302804 ||  || — || January 7, 2003 || Socorro || LINEAR || — || align=right | 3.9 km || 
|-id=805 bgcolor=#d6d6d6
| 302805 ||  || — || January 11, 2003 || Socorro || LINEAR || — || align=right | 4.0 km || 
|-id=806 bgcolor=#d6d6d6
| 302806 ||  || — || January 4, 2003 || Kitt Peak || DLS || EOS || align=right | 1.8 km || 
|-id=807 bgcolor=#E9E9E9
| 302807 ||  || — || January 23, 2003 || Kvistaberg || UDAS || — || align=right | 2.8 km || 
|-id=808 bgcolor=#d6d6d6
| 302808 ||  || — || January 26, 2003 || Haleakala || NEAT || — || align=right | 3.8 km || 
|-id=809 bgcolor=#E9E9E9
| 302809 ||  || — || January 25, 2003 || Palomar || NEAT || — || align=right | 3.0 km || 
|-id=810 bgcolor=#E9E9E9
| 302810 ||  || — || January 27, 2003 || Socorro || LINEAR || — || align=right | 3.9 km || 
|-id=811 bgcolor=#fefefe
| 302811 ||  || — || January 28, 2003 || Kitt Peak || Spacewatch || — || align=right data-sort-value="0.84" | 840 m || 
|-id=812 bgcolor=#d6d6d6
| 302812 ||  || — || January 28, 2003 || Socorro || LINEAR || — || align=right | 6.6 km || 
|-id=813 bgcolor=#d6d6d6
| 302813 ||  || — || January 30, 2003 || Kitt Peak || Spacewatch || — || align=right | 4.0 km || 
|-id=814 bgcolor=#d6d6d6
| 302814 ||  || — || January 28, 2003 || Socorro || LINEAR || — || align=right | 4.3 km || 
|-id=815 bgcolor=#d6d6d6
| 302815 ||  || — || January 29, 2003 || Palomar || NEAT || EOS || align=right | 2.7 km || 
|-id=816 bgcolor=#d6d6d6
| 302816 ||  || — || January 29, 2003 || Palomar || NEAT || EUP || align=right | 6.8 km || 
|-id=817 bgcolor=#d6d6d6
| 302817 ||  || — || January 31, 2003 || Socorro || LINEAR || — || align=right | 3.7 km || 
|-id=818 bgcolor=#fefefe
| 302818 ||  || — || January 25, 2003 || La Silla || La Silla Obs. || — || align=right data-sort-value="0.90" | 900 m || 
|-id=819 bgcolor=#d6d6d6
| 302819 ||  || — || February 1, 2003 || Socorro || LINEAR || — || align=right | 5.6 km || 
|-id=820 bgcolor=#d6d6d6
| 302820 ||  || — || February 1, 2003 || Anderson Mesa || LONEOS || — || align=right | 3.9 km || 
|-id=821 bgcolor=#fefefe
| 302821 ||  || — || February 2, 2003 || Palomar || NEAT || FLO || align=right data-sort-value="0.70" | 700 m || 
|-id=822 bgcolor=#fefefe
| 302822 ||  || — || February 9, 2003 || Palomar || NEAT || — || align=right data-sort-value="0.93" | 930 m || 
|-id=823 bgcolor=#fefefe
| 302823 ||  || — || February 22, 2003 || Palomar || NEAT || — || align=right data-sort-value="0.94" | 940 m || 
|-id=824 bgcolor=#d6d6d6
| 302824 ||  || — || February 23, 2003 || Kitt Peak || Spacewatch || — || align=right | 2.4 km || 
|-id=825 bgcolor=#d6d6d6
| 302825 ||  || — || February 21, 2003 || Palomar || NEAT || THM || align=right | 2.9 km || 
|-id=826 bgcolor=#d6d6d6
| 302826 ||  || — || February 21, 2003 || Palomar || NEAT || — || align=right | 4.3 km || 
|-id=827 bgcolor=#d6d6d6
| 302827 ||  || — || March 9, 2003 || Socorro || LINEAR || TIR || align=right | 3.7 km || 
|-id=828 bgcolor=#fefefe
| 302828 ||  || — || March 11, 2003 || Palomar || NEAT || FLO || align=right data-sort-value="0.69" | 690 m || 
|-id=829 bgcolor=#d6d6d6
| 302829 ||  || — || March 12, 2003 || Kitt Peak || Spacewatch || — || align=right | 3.5 km || 
|-id=830 bgcolor=#FFC2E0
| 302830 ||  || — || March 22, 2003 || Socorro || LINEAR || APO || align=right data-sort-value="0.63" | 630 m || 
|-id=831 bgcolor=#FFC2E0
| 302831 ||  || — || March 23, 2003 || Palomar || NEAT || APOPHA || align=right data-sort-value="0.54" | 540 m || 
|-id=832 bgcolor=#d6d6d6
| 302832 ||  || — || March 23, 2003 || Kitt Peak || Spacewatch || URS || align=right | 3.5 km || 
|-id=833 bgcolor=#fefefe
| 302833 ||  || — || March 11, 2003 || Kitt Peak || Spacewatch || NYS || align=right data-sort-value="0.65" | 650 m || 
|-id=834 bgcolor=#fefefe
| 302834 ||  || — || March 25, 2003 || Palomar || NEAT || — || align=right | 1.0 km || 
|-id=835 bgcolor=#d6d6d6
| 302835 ||  || — || March 24, 2003 || Kitt Peak || Spacewatch || — || align=right | 4.5 km || 
|-id=836 bgcolor=#d6d6d6
| 302836 ||  || — || March 25, 2003 || Haleakala || NEAT || — || align=right | 3.3 km || 
|-id=837 bgcolor=#fefefe
| 302837 ||  || — || March 25, 2003 || Haleakala || NEAT || — || align=right | 1.4 km || 
|-id=838 bgcolor=#d6d6d6
| 302838 ||  || — || March 25, 2003 || Haleakala || NEAT || — || align=right | 4.6 km || 
|-id=839 bgcolor=#fefefe
| 302839 ||  || — || March 26, 2003 || Palomar || NEAT || FLO || align=right data-sort-value="0.79" | 790 m || 
|-id=840 bgcolor=#d6d6d6
| 302840 ||  || — || March 11, 2003 || Palomar || NEAT || — || align=right | 3.4 km || 
|-id=841 bgcolor=#d6d6d6
| 302841 ||  || — || March 26, 2003 || Kitt Peak || Spacewatch || — || align=right | 3.2 km || 
|-id=842 bgcolor=#fefefe
| 302842 ||  || — || March 26, 2003 || Palomar || NEAT || FLO || align=right | 1.5 km || 
|-id=843 bgcolor=#fefefe
| 302843 ||  || — || March 28, 2003 || Anderson Mesa || LONEOS || PHO || align=right | 1.1 km || 
|-id=844 bgcolor=#d6d6d6
| 302844 ||  || — || March 29, 2003 || Anderson Mesa || LONEOS || — || align=right | 4.5 km || 
|-id=845 bgcolor=#d6d6d6
| 302845 ||  || — || March 31, 2003 || Anderson Mesa || LONEOS || — || align=right | 4.0 km || 
|-id=846 bgcolor=#fefefe
| 302846 ||  || — || March 26, 2003 || Palomar || NEAT || — || align=right | 1.1 km || 
|-id=847 bgcolor=#d6d6d6
| 302847 ||  || — || March 31, 2003 || Socorro || LINEAR || — || align=right | 3.5 km || 
|-id=848 bgcolor=#fefefe
| 302848 ||  || — || March 26, 2003 || Anderson Mesa || LONEOS || — || align=right data-sort-value="0.79" | 790 m || 
|-id=849 bgcolor=#d6d6d6
| 302849 Richardboyle ||  ||  || March 27, 2003 || Moletai || K. Černis, J. Zdanavičius || EUP || align=right | 5.8 km || 
|-id=850 bgcolor=#fefefe
| 302850 ||  || — || March 31, 2003 || Kitt Peak || Spacewatch || — || align=right data-sort-value="0.68" | 680 m || 
|-id=851 bgcolor=#d6d6d6
| 302851 ||  || — || March 26, 2003 || Kitt Peak || Spacewatch || — || align=right | 4.3 km || 
|-id=852 bgcolor=#fefefe
| 302852 ||  || — || April 1, 2003 || Socorro || LINEAR || — || align=right | 1.00 km || 
|-id=853 bgcolor=#fefefe
| 302853 ||  || — || April 1, 2003 || Socorro || LINEAR || FLO || align=right data-sort-value="0.70" | 700 m || 
|-id=854 bgcolor=#fefefe
| 302854 ||  || — || April 4, 2003 || Kitt Peak || Spacewatch || — || align=right data-sort-value="0.58" | 580 m || 
|-id=855 bgcolor=#d6d6d6
| 302855 ||  || — || April 7, 2003 || Kitt Peak || Spacewatch || — || align=right | 3.4 km || 
|-id=856 bgcolor=#d6d6d6
| 302856 ||  || — || April 8, 2003 || Kitt Peak || Spacewatch || — || align=right | 4.4 km || 
|-id=857 bgcolor=#d6d6d6
| 302857 ||  || — || April 7, 2003 || Palomar || NEAT || — || align=right | 3.1 km || 
|-id=858 bgcolor=#d6d6d6
| 302858 ||  || — || April 5, 2003 || Kitt Peak || Spacewatch || — || align=right | 2.7 km || 
|-id=859 bgcolor=#d6d6d6
| 302859 ||  || — || April 8, 2003 || Socorro || LINEAR || — || align=right | 4.6 km || 
|-id=860 bgcolor=#d6d6d6
| 302860 ||  || — || April 5, 2003 || Anderson Mesa || LONEOS || EUP || align=right | 6.2 km || 
|-id=861 bgcolor=#fefefe
| 302861 ||  || — || April 9, 2003 || Kitt Peak || Spacewatch || — || align=right data-sort-value="0.69" | 690 m || 
|-id=862 bgcolor=#fefefe
| 302862 ||  || — || April 7, 2003 || Socorro || LINEAR || FLO || align=right data-sort-value="0.74" | 740 m || 
|-id=863 bgcolor=#d6d6d6
| 302863 ||  || — || April 8, 2003 || Palomar || NEAT || — || align=right | 3.7 km || 
|-id=864 bgcolor=#d6d6d6
| 302864 ||  || — || April 1, 2003 || Kitt Peak || DLS || EOS || align=right | 2.8 km || 
|-id=865 bgcolor=#fefefe
| 302865 ||  || — || April 9, 2003 || Palomar || NEAT || — || align=right data-sort-value="0.86" | 860 m || 
|-id=866 bgcolor=#d6d6d6
| 302866 ||  || — || April 1, 2003 || Apache Point || SDSS || EOS || align=right | 2.1 km || 
|-id=867 bgcolor=#fefefe
| 302867 ||  || — || April 24, 2003 || Anderson Mesa || LONEOS || NYS || align=right data-sort-value="0.72" | 720 m || 
|-id=868 bgcolor=#fefefe
| 302868 ||  || — || April 24, 2003 || Anderson Mesa || LONEOS || — || align=right | 1.5 km || 
|-id=869 bgcolor=#d6d6d6
| 302869 ||  || — || April 25, 2003 || Anderson Mesa || LONEOS || — || align=right | 4.6 km || 
|-id=870 bgcolor=#fefefe
| 302870 ||  || — || April 25, 2003 || Campo Imperatore || CINEOS || — || align=right | 1.0 km || 
|-id=871 bgcolor=#FFC2E0
| 302871 ||  || — || April 27, 2003 || Anderson Mesa || LONEOS || AMO || align=right data-sort-value="0.46" | 460 m || 
|-id=872 bgcolor=#d6d6d6
| 302872 ||  || — || April 25, 2003 || Kitt Peak || Spacewatch || — || align=right | 3.0 km || 
|-id=873 bgcolor=#fefefe
| 302873 ||  || — || April 26, 2003 || Kitt Peak || Spacewatch || FLO || align=right data-sort-value="0.58" | 580 m || 
|-id=874 bgcolor=#FA8072
| 302874 ||  || — || April 26, 2003 || Haleakala || NEAT || PHO || align=right | 1.2 km || 
|-id=875 bgcolor=#fefefe
| 302875 ||  || — || April 29, 2003 || Anderson Mesa || LONEOS || — || align=right data-sort-value="0.90" | 900 m || 
|-id=876 bgcolor=#fefefe
| 302876 ||  || — || April 28, 2003 || Kitt Peak || Spacewatch || V || align=right data-sort-value="0.73" | 730 m || 
|-id=877 bgcolor=#d6d6d6
| 302877 ||  || — || April 29, 2003 || Kitt Peak || Spacewatch || — || align=right | 4.9 km || 
|-id=878 bgcolor=#d6d6d6
| 302878 ||  || — || April 25, 2003 || Kitt Peak || Spacewatch || — || align=right | 4.2 km || 
|-id=879 bgcolor=#fefefe
| 302879 ||  || — || May 1, 2003 || Socorro || LINEAR || — || align=right | 1.3 km || 
|-id=880 bgcolor=#fefefe
| 302880 ||  || — || May 9, 2003 || Socorro || LINEAR || — || align=right | 1.3 km || 
|-id=881 bgcolor=#fefefe
| 302881 ||  || — || May 8, 2003 || Socorro || LINEAR || FLO || align=right data-sort-value="0.98" | 980 m || 
|-id=882 bgcolor=#fefefe
| 302882 ||  || — || June 2, 2003 || Kitt Peak || Spacewatch || — || align=right data-sort-value="0.96" | 960 m || 
|-id=883 bgcolor=#d6d6d6
| 302883 ||  || — || June 2, 2003 || Kitt Peak || Spacewatch || — || align=right | 3.8 km || 
|-id=884 bgcolor=#fefefe
| 302884 || 2003 MH || — || June 19, 2003 || Reedy Creek || J. Broughton || NYS || align=right data-sort-value="0.94" | 940 m || 
|-id=885 bgcolor=#fefefe
| 302885 ||  || — || July 1, 2003 || Socorro || LINEAR || — || align=right | 1.5 km || 
|-id=886 bgcolor=#fefefe
| 302886 ||  || — || July 3, 2003 || Kitt Peak || Spacewatch || — || align=right | 1.5 km || 
|-id=887 bgcolor=#fefefe
| 302887 ||  || — || July 3, 2003 || Kitt Peak || Spacewatch || — || align=right | 1.2 km || 
|-id=888 bgcolor=#fefefe
| 302888 ||  || — || July 6, 2003 || Kitt Peak || Spacewatch || — || align=right | 1.1 km || 
|-id=889 bgcolor=#fefefe
| 302889 ||  || — || July 5, 2003 || Kitt Peak || Spacewatch || — || align=right data-sort-value="0.86" | 860 m || 
|-id=890 bgcolor=#fefefe
| 302890 ||  || — || July 23, 2003 || Palomar || NEAT || — || align=right | 1.2 km || 
|-id=891 bgcolor=#fefefe
| 302891 ||  || — || July 27, 2003 || Palomar || NEAT || — || align=right | 1.4 km || 
|-id=892 bgcolor=#fefefe
| 302892 ||  || — || July 24, 2003 || Palomar || NEAT || — || align=right data-sort-value="0.84" | 840 m || 
|-id=893 bgcolor=#fefefe
| 302893 || 2003 PK || — || August 1, 2003 || Črni Vrh || J. Skvarč || H || align=right | 1.0 km || 
|-id=894 bgcolor=#fefefe
| 302894 ||  || — || August 18, 2003 || Campo Imperatore || CINEOS || — || align=right | 1.2 km || 
|-id=895 bgcolor=#fefefe
| 302895 ||  || — || August 20, 2003 || Campo Imperatore || CINEOS || NYS || align=right data-sort-value="0.86" | 860 m || 
|-id=896 bgcolor=#fefefe
| 302896 ||  || — || August 20, 2003 || Campo Imperatore || CINEOS || MAScritical || align=right data-sort-value="0.75" | 750 m || 
|-id=897 bgcolor=#fefefe
| 302897 ||  || — || August 21, 2003 || Palomar || NEAT || MAS || align=right data-sort-value="0.98" | 980 m || 
|-id=898 bgcolor=#FA8072
| 302898 ||  || — || August 22, 2003 || Palomar || NEAT || — || align=right data-sort-value="0.52" | 520 m || 
|-id=899 bgcolor=#E9E9E9
| 302899 ||  || — || August 22, 2003 || Socorro || LINEAR || — || align=right | 1.0 km || 
|-id=900 bgcolor=#fefefe
| 302900 ||  || — || August 22, 2003 || Palomar || NEAT || — || align=right | 1.1 km || 
|}

302901–303000 

|-bgcolor=#fefefe
| 302901 ||  || — || August 22, 2003 || Palomar || NEAT || — || align=right | 1.2 km || 
|-id=902 bgcolor=#fefefe
| 302902 ||  || — || August 31, 2003 || Haleakala || NEAT || — || align=right | 1.4 km || 
|-id=903 bgcolor=#E9E9E9
| 302903 ||  || — || August 30, 2003 || Haleakala || NEAT || — || align=right | 2.8 km || 
|-id=904 bgcolor=#fefefe
| 302904 ||  || — || September 1, 2003 || Socorro || LINEAR || — || align=right | 1.6 km || 
|-id=905 bgcolor=#fefefe
| 302905 ||  || — || September 18, 2003 || Palomar || NEAT || — || align=right | 1.2 km || 
|-id=906 bgcolor=#fefefe
| 302906 ||  || — || September 18, 2003 || Desert Eagle || W. K. Y. Yeung || SUL || align=right | 3.8 km || 
|-id=907 bgcolor=#fefefe
| 302907 ||  || — || September 18, 2003 || Palomar || NEAT || NYS || align=right data-sort-value="0.87" | 870 m || 
|-id=908 bgcolor=#E9E9E9
| 302908 ||  || — || September 16, 2003 || Palomar || NEAT || JUL || align=right | 1.5 km || 
|-id=909 bgcolor=#fefefe
| 302909 ||  || — || September 16, 2003 || Anderson Mesa || LONEOS || V || align=right data-sort-value="0.89" | 890 m || 
|-id=910 bgcolor=#d6d6d6
| 302910 ||  || — || September 18, 2003 || Palomar || NEAT || 3:2 || align=right | 7.2 km || 
|-id=911 bgcolor=#fefefe
| 302911 ||  || — || September 18, 2003 || Palomar || NEAT || — || align=right | 1.2 km || 
|-id=912 bgcolor=#fefefe
| 302912 ||  || — || September 18, 2003 || Palomar || NEAT || — || align=right | 1.2 km || 
|-id=913 bgcolor=#fefefe
| 302913 ||  || — || September 16, 2003 || Kitt Peak || Spacewatch || NYS || align=right data-sort-value="0.83" | 830 m || 
|-id=914 bgcolor=#fefefe
| 302914 ||  || — || September 17, 2003 || Socorro || LINEAR || NYS || align=right data-sort-value="0.96" | 960 m || 
|-id=915 bgcolor=#d6d6d6
| 302915 ||  || — || September 19, 2003 || Kitt Peak || Spacewatch || HIL3:2 || align=right | 6.4 km || 
|-id=916 bgcolor=#fefefe
| 302916 ||  || — || September 19, 2003 || Kitt Peak || Spacewatch || — || align=right | 1.1 km || 
|-id=917 bgcolor=#FA8072
| 302917 ||  || — || September 20, 2003 || Socorro || LINEAR || H || align=right data-sort-value="0.78" | 780 m || 
|-id=918 bgcolor=#E9E9E9
| 302918 ||  || — || September 18, 2003 || Anderson Mesa || LONEOS || — || align=right | 1.6 km || 
|-id=919 bgcolor=#fefefe
| 302919 ||  || — || September 21, 2003 || Socorro || LINEAR || H || align=right data-sort-value="0.68" | 680 m || 
|-id=920 bgcolor=#fefefe
| 302920 ||  || — || September 20, 2003 || Socorro || LINEAR || — || align=right | 1.3 km || 
|-id=921 bgcolor=#fefefe
| 302921 ||  || — || September 23, 2003 || Haleakala || NEAT || — || align=right | 3.1 km || 
|-id=922 bgcolor=#d6d6d6
| 302922 ||  || — || September 19, 2003 || Palomar || NEAT || SHU3:2 || align=right | 5.9 km || 
|-id=923 bgcolor=#fefefe
| 302923 ||  || — || September 20, 2003 || Palomar || NEAT || — || align=right data-sort-value="0.78" | 780 m || 
|-id=924 bgcolor=#fefefe
| 302924 ||  || — || September 23, 2003 || Palomar || NEAT || — || align=right | 1.4 km || 
|-id=925 bgcolor=#d6d6d6
| 302925 ||  || — || September 27, 2003 || Socorro || LINEAR || — || align=right | 3.4 km || 
|-id=926 bgcolor=#fefefe
| 302926 ||  || — || September 27, 2003 || Desert Eagle || W. K. Y. Yeung || — || align=right | 1.0 km || 
|-id=927 bgcolor=#E9E9E9
| 302927 ||  || — || September 28, 2003 || Kitt Peak || Spacewatch || — || align=right | 1.1 km || 
|-id=928 bgcolor=#fefefe
| 302928 ||  || — || September 26, 2003 || Socorro || LINEAR || NYS || align=right data-sort-value="0.89" | 890 m || 
|-id=929 bgcolor=#d6d6d6
| 302929 ||  || — || September 28, 2003 || Kitt Peak || Spacewatch || SHU3:2 || align=right | 6.6 km || 
|-id=930 bgcolor=#E9E9E9
| 302930 ||  || — || September 29, 2003 || Socorro || LINEAR || — || align=right data-sort-value="0.80" | 800 m || 
|-id=931 bgcolor=#fefefe
| 302931 ||  || — || September 20, 2003 || Socorro || LINEAR || — || align=right | 1.1 km || 
|-id=932 bgcolor=#fefefe
| 302932 Francoballoni ||  ||  || September 29, 2003 || Andrushivka || Andrushivka Obs. || — || align=right | 1.1 km || 
|-id=933 bgcolor=#fefefe
| 302933 ||  || — || September 16, 2003 || Palomar || NEAT || — || align=right | 1.0 km || 
|-id=934 bgcolor=#E9E9E9
| 302934 ||  || — || September 28, 2003 || Socorro || LINEAR || — || align=right | 1.1 km || 
|-id=935 bgcolor=#fefefe
| 302935 ||  || — || September 22, 2003 || Kitt Peak || Spacewatch || — || align=right data-sort-value="0.93" | 930 m || 
|-id=936 bgcolor=#E9E9E9
| 302936 ||  || — || September 26, 2003 || Apache Point || SDSS || — || align=right | 1.3 km || 
|-id=937 bgcolor=#fefefe
| 302937 ||  || — || September 26, 2003 || Apache Point || SDSS || — || align=right data-sort-value="0.94" | 940 m || 
|-id=938 bgcolor=#fefefe
| 302938 ||  || — || September 26, 2003 || Apache Point || SDSS || — || align=right | 1.1 km || 
|-id=939 bgcolor=#E9E9E9
| 302939 ||  || — || September 26, 2003 || Apache Point || SDSS || — || align=right | 1.2 km || 
|-id=940 bgcolor=#E9E9E9
| 302940 ||  || — || September 27, 2003 || Apache Point || SDSS || — || align=right | 1.3 km || 
|-id=941 bgcolor=#fefefe
| 302941 ||  || — || September 28, 2003 || Apache Point || SDSS || — || align=right | 1.3 km || 
|-id=942 bgcolor=#E9E9E9
| 302942 ||  || — || September 19, 2003 || Kitt Peak || Spacewatch || — || align=right data-sort-value="0.79" | 790 m || 
|-id=943 bgcolor=#fefefe
| 302943 ||  || — || September 28, 2003 || Anderson Mesa || LONEOS || H || align=right data-sort-value="0.54" | 540 m || 
|-id=944 bgcolor=#fefefe
| 302944 ||  || — || October 2, 2003 || Kitt Peak || Spacewatch || H || align=right data-sort-value="0.56" | 560 m || 
|-id=945 bgcolor=#fefefe
| 302945 ||  || — || October 1, 2003 || Anderson Mesa || LONEOS || — || align=right | 1.3 km || 
|-id=946 bgcolor=#fefefe
| 302946 ||  || — || October 15, 2003 || Anderson Mesa || LONEOS || NYS || align=right data-sort-value="0.91" | 910 m || 
|-id=947 bgcolor=#E9E9E9
| 302947 ||  || — || October 1, 2003 || Kitt Peak || Spacewatch || — || align=right data-sort-value="0.57" | 570 m || 
|-id=948 bgcolor=#fefefe
| 302948 ||  || — || October 18, 2003 || Palomar || NEAT || H || align=right data-sort-value="0.96" | 960 m || 
|-id=949 bgcolor=#fefefe
| 302949 ||  || — || October 18, 2003 || Palomar || NEAT || H || align=right data-sort-value="0.85" | 850 m || 
|-id=950 bgcolor=#fefefe
| 302950 ||  || — || October 16, 2003 || Anderson Mesa || LONEOS || H || align=right data-sort-value="0.79" | 790 m || 
|-id=951 bgcolor=#E9E9E9
| 302951 ||  || — || October 19, 2003 || Kitt Peak || Spacewatch || — || align=right | 1.1 km || 
|-id=952 bgcolor=#fefefe
| 302952 ||  || — || October 17, 2003 || Kitt Peak || Spacewatch || MAS || align=right data-sort-value="0.90" | 900 m || 
|-id=953 bgcolor=#fefefe
| 302953 ||  || — || October 17, 2003 || Kitt Peak || Spacewatch || — || align=right | 1.1 km || 
|-id=954 bgcolor=#d6d6d6
| 302954 ||  || — || October 16, 2003 || Anderson Mesa || LONEOS || Tj (2.96) || align=right | 7.4 km || 
|-id=955 bgcolor=#fefefe
| 302955 ||  || — || October 20, 2003 || Kitt Peak || Spacewatch || — || align=right | 1.3 km || 
|-id=956 bgcolor=#fefefe
| 302956 ||  || — || October 18, 2003 || Kitt Peak || Spacewatch || — || align=right | 1.5 km || 
|-id=957 bgcolor=#E9E9E9
| 302957 ||  || — || October 19, 2003 || Kitt Peak || Spacewatch || — || align=right data-sort-value="0.89" | 890 m || 
|-id=958 bgcolor=#fefefe
| 302958 ||  || — || October 22, 2003 || Socorro || LINEAR || H || align=right data-sort-value="0.82" | 820 m || 
|-id=959 bgcolor=#E9E9E9
| 302959 ||  || — || October 21, 2003 || Anderson Mesa || LONEOS || — || align=right data-sort-value="0.95" | 950 m || 
|-id=960 bgcolor=#E9E9E9
| 302960 ||  || — || October 21, 2003 || Socorro || LINEAR || — || align=right | 1.1 km || 
|-id=961 bgcolor=#E9E9E9
| 302961 ||  || — || October 23, 2003 || Anderson Mesa || LONEOS || — || align=right | 1.8 km || 
|-id=962 bgcolor=#E9E9E9
| 302962 ||  || — || October 21, 2003 || Kitt Peak || Spacewatch || — || align=right | 1.1 km || 
|-id=963 bgcolor=#E9E9E9
| 302963 ||  || — || October 22, 2003 || Socorro || LINEAR || — || align=right | 1.2 km || 
|-id=964 bgcolor=#E9E9E9
| 302964 ||  || — || October 24, 2003 || Socorro || LINEAR || — || align=right data-sort-value="0.73" | 730 m || 
|-id=965 bgcolor=#E9E9E9
| 302965 ||  || — || October 24, 2003 || Kitt Peak || Spacewatch || — || align=right data-sort-value="0.86" | 860 m || 
|-id=966 bgcolor=#E9E9E9
| 302966 ||  || — || October 24, 2003 || Kitt Peak || Spacewatch || — || align=right | 1.2 km || 
|-id=967 bgcolor=#E9E9E9
| 302967 ||  || — || October 25, 2003 || Socorro || LINEAR || — || align=right data-sort-value="0.82" | 820 m || 
|-id=968 bgcolor=#E9E9E9
| 302968 ||  || — || October 28, 2003 || Haleakala || NEAT || — || align=right data-sort-value="0.98" | 980 m || 
|-id=969 bgcolor=#E9E9E9
| 302969 ||  || — || October 30, 2003 || Socorro || LINEAR || RAF || align=right | 1.1 km || 
|-id=970 bgcolor=#E9E9E9
| 302970 ||  || — || October 17, 2003 || Kitt Peak || Spacewatch || — || align=right | 1.0 km || 
|-id=971 bgcolor=#fefefe
| 302971 ||  || — || October 17, 2003 || Kitt Peak || Spacewatch || — || align=right | 1.2 km || 
|-id=972 bgcolor=#fefefe
| 302972 ||  || — || October 18, 2003 || Anderson Mesa || LONEOS || — || align=right | 1.4 km || 
|-id=973 bgcolor=#E9E9E9
| 302973 ||  || — || October 21, 2003 || Anderson Mesa || LONEOS || — || align=right | 1.6 km || 
|-id=974 bgcolor=#fefefe
| 302974 ||  || — || October 29, 2003 || Socorro || LINEAR || H || align=right data-sort-value="0.79" | 790 m || 
|-id=975 bgcolor=#fefefe
| 302975 ||  || — || October 19, 2003 || Apache Point || SDSS || V || align=right data-sort-value="0.81" | 810 m || 
|-id=976 bgcolor=#fefefe
| 302976 ||  || — || October 19, 2003 || Apache Point || SDSS || MAS || align=right data-sort-value="0.86" | 860 m || 
|-id=977 bgcolor=#fefefe
| 302977 ||  || — || October 17, 2003 || Apache Point || SDSS || — || align=right data-sort-value="0.88" | 880 m || 
|-id=978 bgcolor=#fefefe
| 302978 ||  || — || October 18, 2003 || Apache Point || SDSS || — || align=right data-sort-value="0.77" | 770 m || 
|-id=979 bgcolor=#fefefe
| 302979 ||  || — || October 1, 2003 || Kitt Peak || Spacewatch || LCI || align=right | 1.6 km || 
|-id=980 bgcolor=#E9E9E9
| 302980 ||  || — || June 13, 2002 || Palomar || NEAT || — || align=right | 2.8 km || 
|-id=981 bgcolor=#fefefe
| 302981 ||  || — || October 22, 2003 || Apache Point || SDSS || — || align=right | 1.2 km || 
|-id=982 bgcolor=#fefefe
| 302982 ||  || — || October 22, 2003 || Apache Point || SDSS || — || align=right data-sort-value="0.83" | 830 m || 
|-id=983 bgcolor=#fefefe
| 302983 ||  || — || October 22, 2003 || Apache Point || SDSS || MAS || align=right data-sort-value="0.82" | 820 m || 
|-id=984 bgcolor=#fefefe
| 302984 ||  || — || October 22, 2003 || Apache Point || SDSS || V || align=right data-sort-value="0.68" | 680 m || 
|-id=985 bgcolor=#E9E9E9
| 302985 ||  || — || November 14, 2003 || Palomar || NEAT || — || align=right | 1.0 km || 
|-id=986 bgcolor=#E9E9E9
| 302986 ||  || — || November 4, 2003 || Socorro || LINEAR || — || align=right | 2.1 km || 
|-id=987 bgcolor=#E9E9E9
| 302987 ||  || — || November 16, 2003 || Catalina || CSS || — || align=right | 1.7 km || 
|-id=988 bgcolor=#E9E9E9
| 302988 ||  || — || November 16, 2003 || Kitt Peak || Spacewatch || — || align=right | 1.2 km || 
|-id=989 bgcolor=#E9E9E9
| 302989 ||  || — || November 16, 2003 || Catalina || CSS || — || align=right | 1.1 km || 
|-id=990 bgcolor=#E9E9E9
| 302990 ||  || — || November 20, 2003 || Socorro || LINEAR || — || align=right | 1.2 km || 
|-id=991 bgcolor=#E9E9E9
| 302991 ||  || — || November 18, 2003 || Kitt Peak || Spacewatch || — || align=right | 1.3 km || 
|-id=992 bgcolor=#FA8072
| 302992 ||  || — || November 21, 2003 || Socorro || LINEAR || — || align=right | 1.8 km || 
|-id=993 bgcolor=#E9E9E9
| 302993 ||  || — || November 18, 2003 || Kitt Peak || Spacewatch || — || align=right | 2.3 km || 
|-id=994 bgcolor=#E9E9E9
| 302994 ||  || — || November 18, 2003 || Palomar || NEAT || MAR || align=right | 1.6 km || 
|-id=995 bgcolor=#E9E9E9
| 302995 ||  || — || November 19, 2003 || Kitt Peak || Spacewatch || — || align=right | 1.7 km || 
|-id=996 bgcolor=#E9E9E9
| 302996 ||  || — || November 21, 2003 || Catalina || CSS || BRU || align=right | 2.4 km || 
|-id=997 bgcolor=#E9E9E9
| 302997 ||  || — || November 18, 2003 || Palomar || NEAT || — || align=right | 1.3 km || 
|-id=998 bgcolor=#E9E9E9
| 302998 ||  || — || November 19, 2003 || Kitt Peak || Spacewatch || — || align=right | 1.9 km || 
|-id=999 bgcolor=#E9E9E9
| 302999 ||  || — || November 18, 2003 || Kitt Peak || Spacewatch || — || align=right | 1.1 km || 
|-id=000 bgcolor=#E9E9E9
| 303000 ||  || — || November 18, 2003 || Palomar || NEAT || — || align=right | 2.2 km || 
|}

References

External links 
 Discovery Circumstances: Numbered Minor Planets (300001)–(305000) (IAU Minor Planet Center)

0302